= Glicaramide =

Chemical compound

Clinical data
- ATC code: None

Identifiers
- IUPAC name: N-[2-[4-(cyclohexylcarbamoylsulfamoyl)phenyl]ethyl]-1-ethyl-3-methyl-4-(3-methylbutoxy)pyrazolo[3,4-b]pyridine-5-carboxamide
- CAS Number: 36980-34-4
- PubChem CID: 65799
- ChemSpider: 59215
- UNII: UK5SR22C8Q
- ChEMBL: ChEMBL2106430
- CompTox Dashboard (EPA): DTXSID60190471

Chemical and physical data
- Formula: C_{30}H_{42}N_{6}O_{5}S
- Molar mass: 598.76 g·mol^{−1}
- 3D model (JSmol): Interactive image
- SMILES: C0CCCCC0NC(=O)NS(=O)(=O)c1ccc(cc1)CCNC(=O)c2cnc3n(CC)nc(C)c3c2OCCC(C)C

Glicaramide (SQ-65993) is an orally bioavailable anti-diabetic medication. It has a similar potency as glibenclamide (glyburide) in the class of medication known as sulfonylureas. Its structure is similar since it has a cyclic acyl group which replaces the latter's 2-methoxy-5-chlorobenzyl. Same as glibenclamide, it is classified as a second-generation sulfonylurea. It may have more pronounced extra-pancreatic effects than glibenclamide or tolbutamide.

== See also ==
- Glibenclamide
