= Tall Man lettering =

Practice of writing part of a drug's name in upper case letters

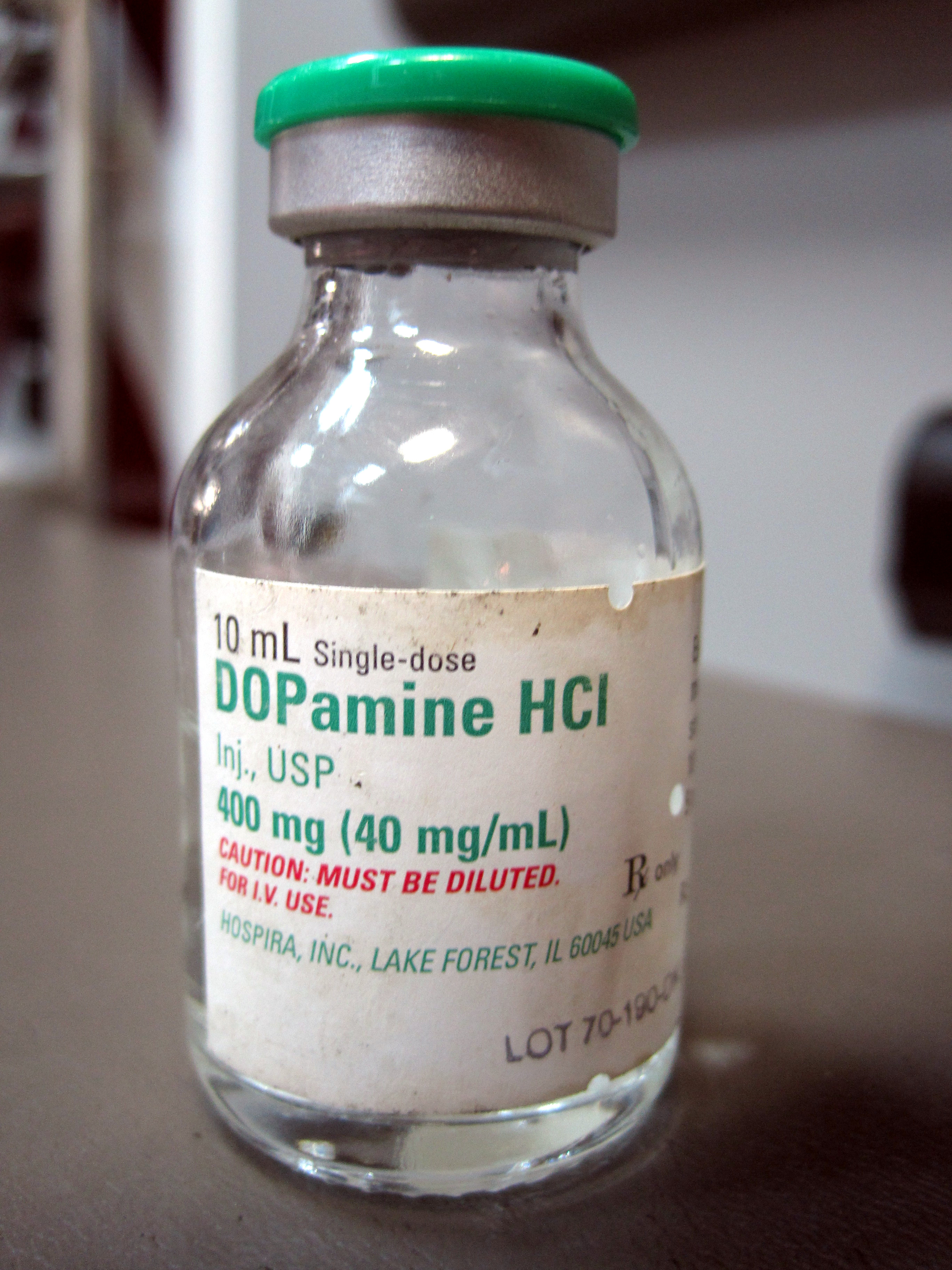
A vial of dopamine, labeled as "DOPamine HCl"

Tall man lettering (tall-man lettering or tallman lettering) is the practice of writing part of a drug's name in upper case letters to help distinguish sound-alike, look-alike drugs from one another in order to avoid medication errors. For example, in tall man lettering, "prednisone" and "prednisolone" should be written "predniSONE" and "prednisoLONE", respectively. The Office of Generic Drugs of the US Food and Drug Administration (FDA) encourages manufacturers to use tall man lettering labels to visually differentiate their drugs' names, and a number of hospitals, clinics, and health care systems use tall man lettering in their computerized order entry, automated dispensing machines, medication admission records, prescription labels, and drug product labels.

== Effectiveness ==
Wrong-drug errors have been found to occur at a rate of about one per thousand orders filled or dispensed. Evidence regarding the effect of Tall Man lettering on error rates is mixed.

A 2004 eye-tracking study found that Tall Man lettering resulted in fewer errors when selecting a target drug from an array of choices. Other laboratory-based studies of Tall Man lettering show a mixture of positive and null results, which may be further complicated due to demand characteristics of some of the studies.

A 2016 time-series analysis of data from 42 children's hospitals over a 9-year period found no significant difference before and after a 2007 recommendation for hospitals to adopt Tall Man lettering. However, this study has been criticized due to methodological limitations, such as not recording when and how Tall Man lettering was adopted, if at all, at each of the hospitals studied.

== Examples ==
The FDA published a list of recommended Tall-Man Letters for look-alike drugs which includes, but is not limited to:

- acetaZOLAMIDE vs. acetoHEXAMIDE
- buPROPion vs. busPIRone
- chlorproMAZINE vs. chlorproPAMIDE
- clomiPHENE vs. clomiPRAMINE
- cycloSERINE vs. cycloSPORINE
- DAUNOrubicin vs. DOXOrubicin
- DOBUTamine vs. DOPamine
- hydrALAzine vs. hydrOXYzine
- TOLAZamide vs. TOLBUTamide
- vinBLAStine vs. vinCRIStine

The Institute for Safe Medication Practices (ISMP) has a supplemental list covering pairs not recommended by the FDA, but considered necessary by the ISMP. ISMP Canada also offers additional recommendations.

== See also ==
- Health informatics
