= Glysobuzole =

Names
- Preferred IUPAC name 4-Methoxy-N-[5-(2-methylpropyl)-1,3,4-thiadiazol-2-yl]benzene-1-sulfonamide

Identifiers
CAS Number	3567-08-6
3D model (JSmol)	Interactive image
ChEMBL	ChEMBL1481457
ChemSpider	204351
PubChem CID	234310
UNII	887VHL8899
CompTox Dashboard (EPA)	DTXSID0046276
- InChI: InChI=1S/C13H17N3O3S2/c1-9(2)8-12-14-15-13(20-12)16-21(17,18)11-6-4-10(19-3)5-7-11/h4-7,9H,8H2,1-3H3,(H,15,16) Key: LZCBNYVJTNCPDR-UHFFFAOYSA-N
- SMILES: CC(C)CC1=NN=C(NS(=O)(=O)C2=CC=C(C=C2)OC)S1

Properties
Chemical formula	C_{13}H_{17}N_{3}O_{3}S_{2}
Molar mass	327.4 g/mol
Density	1.338 g/cm3
Boiling point	486.5 °C at 760 mmHg

Hazards
Flash point	248 °C (478 °F; 521 K)
- Except where otherwise noted, data are given for materials in their standard state (at 25 °C [77 °F], 100 kPa). Infobox references

Glysobuzole (or isobuzole) is an oral antidiabetic drug, it is taken once daily by oral administration and it is water soluble to become pharmaceutically active within the gastrointestinal tract. It is a sulfonamide derivative that is similar to sulfonylureas. Glysobuzole has antihyperglycemic activity, so it is able to lower blood glucose levels by increasing the release of insulin from the pancreatic beta cells. Glysobuzole functions as a modulator in metabolic processes involving insulin and therefore it is used to treat diabetes.

== Structure and reactivity ==
The molecular formula of glysobuzole is C_{13}H_{17}N_{3}O_{3}S_{2}. It is synonymously found under the name isobuzole. Its systematic name is 4-methoxy-N-[5-(2-methylpropyl)-1,3,4-thiadiazol-2-yl]benzenesulfonamide. Its achiral structure includes a benzene ring connected to a thiadiazole via a sulfonamide. The thiadiazole is bound to an iso-butyl group. The molecular weight is 327.427 Dalton.

== Synthesis ==
The general pathway of synthesizing sulfonamides is through a substitution reaction involving an amine and a sulfonyl chloride. Alternatively, this can be done with sulfonate esters and ammonia. However, no literature can be found on such an alternative pathway for the synthesis of glysobuzole. The synthesis of glysobuzole involves three reagents: p-anisylsulfonyl chloride, thiosemicarbazide and isovaleric acid.

Structure of isovaleric acid

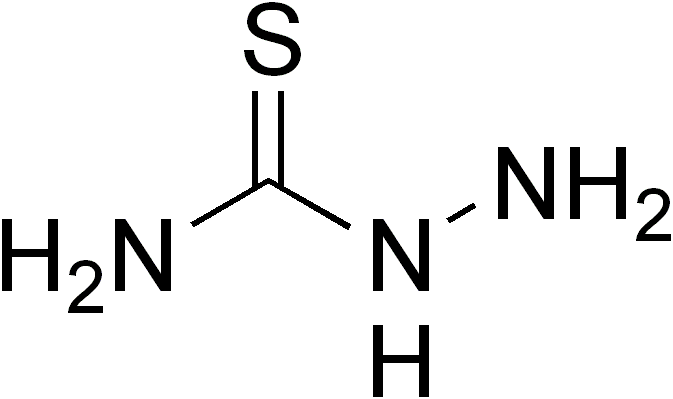
Structure of thiosemicarbazide

Thiosemicarbazide will form the five-membered ring in the structure. Before the cyclization of thiosemicarbazide, it will first undergo acylation to form a monothiodiacylhydrazine. This happens under the influence of a carboxylic acid such as isovaleric acid. The acid will donate an acyl group to the thiosemicarbazide. The intermediate compound cyclizes under the influence of an acid catalyst.

A compound very similar to glysobuzole is glybuzole. The two compounds both contain a hypoglycemic part, which are structurally identical. The synthesis pathway of glysobuzole is very similar to the synthesis pathway of glybuzole. For both compounds, the reaction is a bimolecular substitution reaction (S_{N}2). When synthesizing glybuzole, pyridine is added as an oxidation step at the end of the reaction. The intermediate compound will have a positive charge. Pyridine takes up the oxygen to remove the positive charge present on the nitrogen atom.

== Mechanism of action ==
Due to the hypoglycemic activity of glysobuzole it is used to treat type 2 diabetes by raising the plasma insulin levels and, effectively, lowering the blood glucose levels. Glysobuzole binds to sulfonylurea-specific receptors on pancreatic β-cells and blocks the ATP-dependent channels for potassium. The inflow of K^{+} ions stops and the cell membrane depolarizes, resulting in the diffusion of calcium into the cell. The actomyosin filaments of β-cells contract and release insulin. Secretion of insulin in large amounts decreases the concentration of glucose in blood.

== Metabolism ==
After oral intake, glysobuzole is absorbed in the intestine. Metabolism takes time to come into effect, therefore the drug should be ingested 30 minutes before a meal. It binds to plasma proteins and induce their biological effect on the body. Afterwards, they undergo N-acetylation and oxidation, and are exerted from the body through the urinary tract.

== Efficacy ==
Apart from their hypoglycemic activity, sulfonamides, including glysobuzole, show bacterial resistance. They are competitive inhibitors of folic acid synthesis preventing the reproduction and growth of microbes, making them bacteriostatic agents. Therefore, they are the first successful antibacterial drugs used in infections.

== Adverse effects ==
If glycemic control has not been reached after 2 weeks, the dosage should be increased, this can be done until control is reached. However, there is the danger of excessive dosages, as a result, this can lead to hypoglycemia caused by abnormal insulin production. Insulin induction by glysobuzole is independent of the glucose levels which only increases the risk of lowering the blood sugar below normal. Moreover, it can lead to weight gain, nausea, skin irritation and, very rarely, photosensitivity. Some patients become susceptible to urinary tract infections, after one incident the likelihood of another increases, therefore it can further lead to a urinary tract disorder. This is caused by metabolite precipitation due to acetylated sulfonamides in the urinary tract.

== Toxicity ==
The six membered benzene ring causes skin sensitization. The sulfonyl nitrate part of the compound causes ocular toxicity.

=== Acute toxicity data - lethal dose ===
type of test	species	route of exposure	dose	toxic effects
LD_{50}	rodent - rat	oral	534 mg/kg	details of toxic effects not reported other than lethal dose value
LD_{50}	rodent - mouse	oral	468 mg/kg	details of toxic effects not reported other than lethal dose value
LD_{50}	rodent - mouse	intraperitoneal	250 mg/kg	behavioral - ataxia; endocrine - hypoglycemia; nutritional and gross metabolic - body temperature decrease
LD	mammal - dog	oral	>1 gm/kg	behavioral - tremor, muscle weakness; gastrointestinal - nausea or vomiting

=== Tumorigenic data ===
type of test	species	route or exposure	dose	toxic effects
TDLo - Lowest published toxic dose	rodent - rat	oral	214 gm/kg/52W-C	tumorigenic - equivocal tumorigenic agent by RTECS criteria; kidney, ureter, bladder - tumors
