= Tosifen =

Possible heart rhythm drug

Clinical data
- Other names: Sch 11973

Identifiers
- IUPAC name: 1-(4-methylphenyl)sulfonyl-3-[(2S)-1-phenylpropan-2-yl]urea
- CAS Number: 32295-18-4
- PubChem CID: 36102
- ChemSpider: 33207
- UNII: OK1IHO7PG8
- ChEMBL: ChEMBL2105565
- CompTox Dashboard (EPA): DTXSID3046118
- ECHA InfoCard: 100.046.333

Chemical and physical data
- Formula: C_{17}H_{20}N_{2}O_{3}S
- Molar mass: 332.42 g·mol^{−1}
- 3D model (JSmol): Interactive image
- SMILES: CC1=CC=C(C=C1)S(=O)(=O)NC(=O)N[C@@H](C)CC2=CC=CC=C2
- InChI: InChI=1S/C17H20N2O3S/c1-13-8-10-16(11-9-13)23(21,22)19-17(20)18-14(2)12-15-6-4-3-5-7-15/h3-11,14H,12H2,1-2H3,(H2,18,19,20)/t14-/m0/s1; Key:XILWEASNBDKGSA-AWEZNQCLSA-N

Tosifen is a drug candidate for use as an antiarrhythmic agent. Tosifen was synthesized originally in a series of compounds whose basic structural moiety, the sulfonylurea nucleus, was of interest for potential hypoglycemic action. But tosifen is only a weak hypoglycemic agent. It is a potential antianginal and antiarrhythmic agent. The duration of action of tosifen was considerably longer than nitroglycerin and its lack of side effects considerably greater than propranolol. No long-term harmful effects have been observed during 13-week toxicity studies in animals. Tosifen differed from standard antianginal agents which may act via beta-adrenergic blocking activity or alteration of cardiac or circulatory dynamics since no acute pharmacological changes were observed after tosifen was administered. Tosifen was readily absorbed in both rats and dogs. The rates of absorption, metabolism, and urinary excretion were higher in the rat than in the dog.

Attribution: Review: Pharmacology: ADME:

== Synthesis ==
Synthesis of tosifen is by ester-amide displacement between tosylurethane [5577-13-9] (1) and dextroamphetamine [51-64-9] (2) gives tosifen (3).

Tosifen synthesis

Tosylurethane has dual use in the synthesis of tolazamide.
