= AHAS =

AHAS may refer to:

- Acetolactate synthase, a protein, abbreviated ALS or AHAS
  - ALS herbicides/AHAS herbicides, ALS inhibitors/AHAS inhibitors used as herbicides
- Avian Hazard Advisory System, a bird avoidance model developed by the United States Air Force
