= Sulfometuron methyl =

Names
- Preferred IUPAC name Methyl 2-{[(4,6-dimethylpyrimidin-2-yl)carbamoyl]sulfamoyl}benzoate

Identifiers
CAS Number	74222-97-2
3D model (JSmol)	Interactive image
ChEBI	CHEBI:9348
ChEMBL	ChEMBL513261
ChemSpider	47881
ECHA InfoCard	100.070.688
EC Number	277-780-6
KEGG	C10955
PubChem CID	52997
UNII	JLY5D60J1A
CompTox Dashboard (EPA)	DTXSID0034936
- InChI: InChI=1S/C15H16N4O5S/c1-9-8-10(2)17-14(16-9)18-15(21)19-25(22,23)12-7-5-4-6-11(12)13(20)24-3/h4-8H,1-3H3,(H2,16,17,18,19,21) Key: ZDXMLEQEMNLCQG-UHFFFAOYSA-N
- SMILES: CC1=CC(=NC(=N1)NC(=O)NS(=O)(=O)C2=CC=CC=C2C(=O)OC)C

Properties
Chemical formula	C_{15}H_{16}N_{4}O_{5}S
Molar mass	364.38 g·mol^{−1}
Appearance	White solid
Density	1.48 g/cm^{3}
Melting point	202 °C (396 °F; 475 K)
Solubility in water	244 mg/L
Acidity (pK_{a})	5.2

Hazards
- GHS labelling
Pictograms	(GHS07: Exclamation mark) (GHS09: Environmental hazard)
Signal word	Warning
Hazard statements	H319, H332, H410
Precautionary statements	P261, P264+P265, P271, P273, P280, P304+P340, P305+P351+P338, P317, P337+P317, P391, P501
- Except where otherwise noted, data are given for materials in their standard state (at 25 °C [77 °F], 100 kPa). Infobox references

Sulfometuron methyl is an organic compound used as an herbicide. It is classed as a sulfonylurea. It functions via the inhibition of the enzyme acetolactate synthase, which catalyzes the first step in biosynthesis of the branched-chain amino acids valine, leucine, and isoleucine.

Sulfometuron methyl's HRAC classification is Group B (global, Aus), Group 2 (numeric), as it inhibits acetohydroxyacid synthase.
