= FNR =

FNR may refer to:

== Science and medicine ==
- False negative rate
- Agency for Renewable Resources (German: Fachagentur Nachwachsende Rohstoffe), in Germany
- Fast-neutron reactor
- Ferredoxin—NADP(+) reductase
- FNR regulon
- Ford Nuclear Reactor at the University of Michigan

== Transport ==
- Farid Nagar railway station, Pakistan, station code
- Farningham Road railway station, England, station code
- Fung Nin Road stop, Hong Kong, station code
- Funter Bay Seaplane Base, Alaska, US, IATA code
- Namur railway station (Belgium), station code

== Other uses ==
- Frazer-Nash Research, UK R&D company
