= (R)-2,3-Dihydroxy-isovalerate =

Names
- Preferred IUPAC name (2R)-2,3-Dihydroxy-3-methylbutanoic acid

Identifiers
CAS Number	19451-56-0
3D model (JSmol)	Interactive image
ChEBI	CHEBI:15684
ChemSpider	389255
PubChem CID	440279
- InChI: InChI=1S/C5H10O4/c1-5(2,9)3(6)4(7)8/h3,6,9H,1-2H3,(H,7,8)/t3-/m0/s1 Key: JTEYKUFKXGDTEU-VKHMYHEASA-N
- SMILES: CC(C)([C@H](C(=O)O)O)O

Properties
Chemical formula	C_{5}H_{10}O_{4}
Molar mass	134.131 g·mol^{−1}
- Except where otherwise noted, data are given for materials in their standard state (at 25 °C [77 °F], 100 kPa). Infobox references

(R)-2,3-Dihydroxy-isovalerate, also known as α,β-dihydroxyisovalerate, is an important intermediate in the biosynthesis of branched-chain amino acids, particularly valine, leucine, and isoleucine. This organic compound plays a crucial role in several metabolic pathways, including the superpathway of leucine, valine, and isoleucine biosynthesis, as well as pantothenate and coenzyme A (CoA) biosynthesis. It is produced from 3-hydroxy-3-methyl-2-oxobutanoic acid by the enzyme ketol-acid reductoisomerase (EC 1.1.1.86) and is subsequently converted to 2-oxoisovalerate by the enzyme dihydroxy-acid dehydratase (EC 4.2.1.9).
