= Tribenuron =

Tribenuron methyl

Names
- IUPAC name Methyl 2-[[(4-methoxy-6-methyl-1,3,5-triazin-2-yl)-methylcarbamoyl]sulfamoyl]benzoate
- Other names DPX L5300

Identifiers
CAS Number	101200-48-0
3D model (JSmol)	Interactive image
ChEBI	CHEBI:9678
ChEMBL	ChEMBL1229780
ChemSpider	135649
DrugBank	DB03656
ECHA InfoCard	100.100.313
EC Number	401-190-1
KEGG	C10962
PubChem CID	153909
UNII	D0493A985P
CompTox Dashboard (EPA)	DTXSID8024101
- InChI: InChI=1S/C15H17N5O6S/c1-9-16-13(18-14(17-9)26-4)20(2)15(22)19-27(23,24)11-8-6-5-7-10(11)12(21)25-3/h5-8H,1-4H3,(H,19,22) Key: VLCQZHSMCYCDJL-UHFFFAOYSA-N
- SMILES: CC1=NC(=NC(=N1)OC)N(C)C(=O)NS(=O)(=O)C2=CC=CC=C2C(=O)OC

Properties
Chemical formula	C_{15}H_{17}N_{5}O_{6}S
Molar mass	395.39 g·mol^{−1}
Appearance	White to off-white solid
Density	1.46 g/cm^{3}
Melting point	142
Solubility in water	2483 mg/L (20 °C)
log P	0.38
Acidity (pK_{a})	4.65

Hazards
- GHS labelling
Pictograms	(GHS07: Exclamation mark) (GHS08: Health hazard) (GHS09: Environmental hazard)
Signal word	Warning
Hazard statements	H317, H373, H410
Precautionary statements	P260, P272, P273, P280, P302+P352, P319, P321, P333+P317, P362+P364, P391, P501
- Except where otherwise noted, data are given for materials in their standard state (at 25 °C [77 °F], 100 kPa). Infobox references

Tribenuron in the form of tribenuron-methyl is a sulfonylurea herbicide. Its mode of action is the inhibition of acetolactate synthase, Group 2 / Group B of the Herbicide Resistance Action Committee's classification scheme.

== Chemistry ==
In the 1970s, chemists at DuPont worked extensively on sulfonylurea herbicides, following the invention of this class of herbicides by George Levitt which had led to the commercialisation of chlorsulfuron. Tribenuron (the carboxylic acid) and its methyl ester were first disclosed in general terms in one of Levitt's patents and subsequently the ester was subject to further patenting and selected for development under the code name DPX L5300. In the final step of its synthesis, 2-methoxycarbonylbenzenesulfonyl isocyanate was condensed with 2-methylamino-4-methoxy-6-methyl-1,3,5-triazine to form the sulfonylurea product.

== Mode of action ==
Tribenuron is an herbicide that acts as an acetolactate synthase inhibitor. For the purposes of herbicide resistance management, the Herbicide Resistance Action Committee has placed it in group 2 (legacy HRAC Group B).

== Applications ==
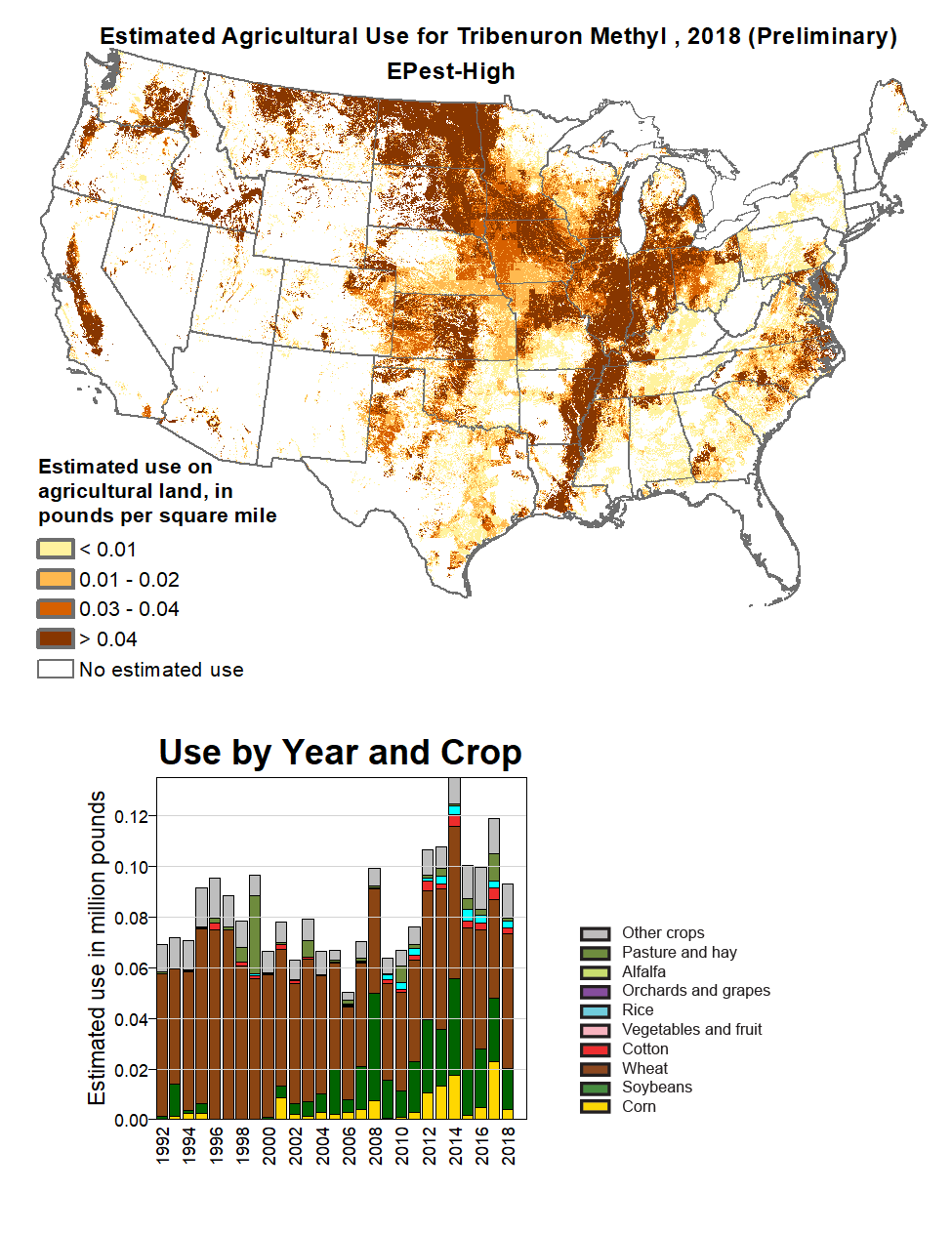
US Geological Survey estimate of tribenuron methyl use in the USA to 2018

Tribenuron has a broad spectrum of activity on commercially important broadleaf weeds and grasses but at the recommended use rate it is safe to important crops such as wheat. When introduced by DuPont, its recommended application rate was 0.015–0.03 pounds per acre (17–34 g/ha). The estimated use in US agriculture is mapped by the US Geological Service and shows that from 1992 to 2018, up to 120,000 pounds (54,000 kg) were applied each year. The compound is used mainly in wheat but also in pasture.

== Physicochemistry ==
In a clay-water suspension, tribenuron has increased sorption with decreasing pH and even more so with suspended load.

== Resistant crops ==
A tribenuron-resistance transformation has been achieved in watermelon and validated by survival of the als mutants but not the controls, under tribenuron treatment.

Two oilseed type sunflower cultivars have been produced by USDA-ARS by conventional breeding.
