= Flazasulfuron =

Names
- Preferred IUPAC name N-[(4,6-Dimethoxypyrimidin-2-yl)carbamoyl]-3-(trifluoromethyl)pyridine-2-sulfonamide
- Other names Katana, Shibagen

Identifiers
CAS Number	104040-78-0
3D model (JSmol)	Interactive image
ChemSpider	84440
ECHA InfoCard	100.123.655
PubChem CID	93539
UNII	3SB13WWV30
CompTox Dashboard (EPA)	DTXSID3034610
- InChI: InChI=1S/C13H12F3N5O5S/c1-25-8-6-9(26-2)19-11(18-8)20-12(22)21-27(23,24)10-7(13(14,15)16)4-3-5-17-10/h3-6H,1-2H3,(H2,18,19,20,21,22) Key: HWATZEJQIXKWQS-UHFFFAOYSA-N; InChI=1/C13H12F3N5O5S/c1-25-8-6-9(26-2)19-11(18-8)20-12(22)21-27(23,24)10-7(13(14,15)16)4-3-5-17-10/h3-6H,1-2H3,(H2,18,19,20,21,22) Key: HWATZEJQIXKWQS-UHFFFAOYAQ
- SMILES: COc1cc(nc(n1)NC(=O)NS(=O)(=O)c2c(cccn2)C(F)(F)F)OC

Properties
Chemical formula	C_{13}H_{12}F_{3}N_{5}O_{5}S
Molar mass	407.32 g·mol^{−1}
Appearance	White solid
Melting point	166–170 °C (331–338 °F; 439–443 K)
- Except where otherwise noted, data are given for materials in their standard state (at 25 °C [77 °F], 100 kPa). Infobox references

Flazasulfuron is a sulfonylurea herbicide used for controlling the unwanted growth of grass, broad-leaved weeds and sedges. The mode of action of flazasulfuron is through the inhibition of the enzyme acetolactate synthase (ALS), which results in the inhibition of amino acid synthesis, cell division and ultimately plant growth. Flazasulfuron can be used on both pre-emergent weeds and post-emergent weeds. Growth ceases within hours of the application of the compound. Symptoms include leaf discolouration, desiccation, necrosis and ultimately plant death within 20 – 25 days of application. It is a white, water-soluble solid.

Flazasulfuron's HRAC classification is Group B (global, Aus), Group 2 (numeric), as it inhibits acetohydroxyacid synthase.

== Synthesis ==
The synthesis of flazasulfuron begins with the one pot chlorination and chlorine/fluorine exchange of 3-picoline (1). This reaction is performed in the gas phase in a purpose built reactor where the desired product (2) is one of the components of the crude product mixture. Treatment of (2) with sodium hydrosulfide gives (3) by nucleophillic aromatic substitution. Acidic oxidation with chlorine produces the sulfonylchloride which is filtered off and added directly to chilled concentrated ammonia solution to produce 3-trifluoromethylpyridin-2-yl sulfonamide (4). Treatment with diphenylcarbonate (5) and sodium hydride gives the carbamate (6). Finally, flazasulfuron is obtained by the reaction of (6) with 4,6-dimethoxy-1-aminopyrimidine in dioxane.

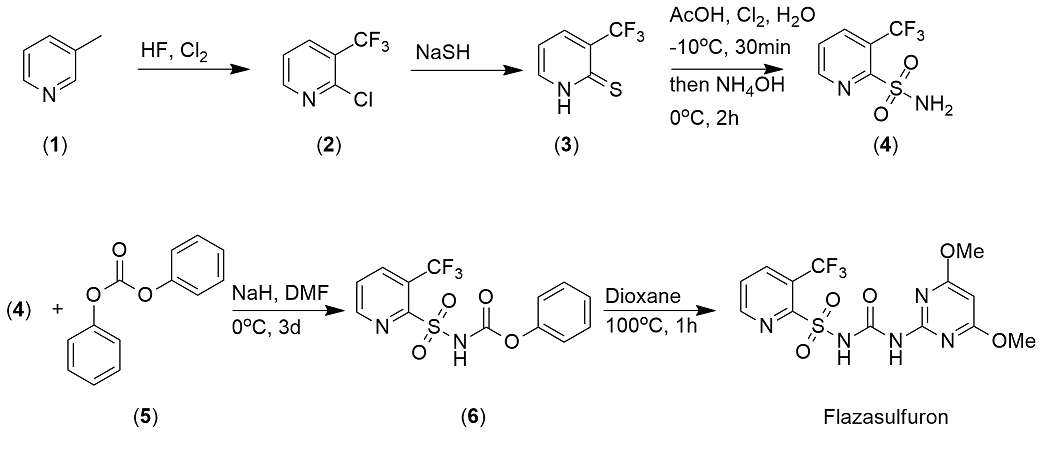

An alternative strategy is to use (4) as nucleophile with the O-phenylcarbamate of 4,6-dimethoxy-1-aminopyrimidine (7) as electrophile in the presence of DBN.

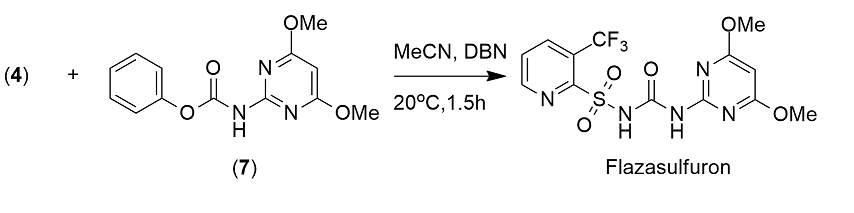

== Links ==
- Flazasulfuron in the Pesticide Properties DataBase (PPDB)
