= Imazosulfuron =

Names
- Preferred IUPAC name 1-(2-chloroimidazo[1,2-a]pyridin-3-ylsulfonyl)-3-(4,6-dimethoxypyrimidin-2-yl)urea
- Other names URA-09800-H-0-WG

Identifiers
CAS Number	122548-33-8
3D model (JSmol)	Interactive image
ChEBI	CHEBI:81751
ChemSpider	83451
ECHA InfoCard	100.127.566
EC Number	602-788-7
KEGG	C18443
PubChem CID	92433
UNII	27LUJ2BJDG
CompTox Dashboard (EPA)	DTXSID2057946
- InChI: InChI=1S/C14H13ClN6O5S/c1-25-9-7-10(26-2)18-13(17-9)19-14(22)20-27(23,24)12-11(15)16-8-5-3-4-6-21(8)12/h3-7H,1-2H3,(H2,17,18,19,20,22) Key: NAGRVUXEKKZNHT-UHFFFAOYSA-N
- SMILES: COC1=CC(=NC(=N1)NC(=O)NS(=O)(=O)C2=C(N=C3N2C=CC=C3)Cl)OC

Properties
Chemical formula	C_{14}H_{13}ClN_{6}O_{5}S
Molar mass	412.81 g·mol^{−1}
Density	1.652 g/mL
Melting point	198 °C (388 °F; 471 K)
Solubility in water	429 mg/L at pH 7; 3936 mg/L at pH 9
Vapor pressure	<3.5 μPa

Hazards
- GHS labelling
Pictograms	(GHS09: Environmental hazard)
Signal word	Warning
Hazard statements	H410
Precautionary statements	P273, P391, P501
- Lethal dose or concentration (LD, LC)
LD_{50} (median dose)	>5000 mg/kg (rat, oral); >2000mg/kg (rat, dermal)
LC_{50} (median concentration)	>2.12 mg/L (rat, inhalation)
- Except where otherwise noted, data are given for materials in their standard state (at 25 °C [77 °F], 100 kPa). Infobox references

Imazosulfuron is a selective sulfonylurea herbicide to control sedges and broadleaf weeds. It is a preëmergent and postemergent herbicide. In the US, it was first registered in 2010 and is approved for residential and commercial use on turfgrass, rice, tomatoes and peppers.

It is not approved in the European Union.

The maximum application rate in the US is 0.3 lbs per acre (0.3 kg/Ha) for food use, or 0.67 lbs per acre (0.75 kg/Ha) for turf.

== Mode of action ==
Imazosulfuron inhibits the enzyme acetolactate synthase, preventing synthesis of branch chain amino acids like valine, leucine, and isoleucine, which are necessary for cell formation. It is absorbed through roots and foliage, and translocates through xylem and phloem.

Imazosulfuron's mode of action makes its HRAC classification Group B (Australia, Global) or Group 2 (numeric).

== Environmental behaviour ==
Imazosulfuron is moderately mobile in soil, but is not volatile and so will not be moved atmospherically after application. It degrades primarily through aerobic and anaerobic biodegradation and aqueous photolysis. In soil, its half life is expected to be several weeks, but the water halflife is 3.5 days due to photolysis. Movement is expected by runoff and leaching, but contamination is not expected to be persistent.

It is practically non-toxic to birds, mammals and honeybees, and no significant toxicity was found to fish.

== Safety ==
Imazosulfuron is of low toxicity via oral, inhalatory or dermal exposure. It is not an eye nor skin irritant, nor a skin sensitizer. In chronic exposure trials, the liver is the main affected organ, though rats given >1000 mg/kg/day (equivalent to about a shot-glass of pure imazosulfuron daily for an 80 kg person) developed eye problems after three months. Chronic exposure studies often showed weight gain or loss. Mild to moderate thyroid effects were reported only in the study of chronic exposure to dogs. Subchronic trials showed no neurotoxicity.

No developmental or reproductive toxicity was found except at the highest dosage tested (892 mg/kg/day) on rats. No evidence of carcinogenicity was found.
