= C5H10O4 =

The molecular formula C_{5}H_{10}O_{4} (molar mass: 134.13 g/mol, exact mass: 134.0579 u) may refer to:

- Deoxyribose, or 2-deoxyribose
- (R)-2,3-Dihydroxyisovalerate
- Monoacetylglycerol
- 1,4-Anhydroxylitol, or xylitan
