= Primisulfuron =

Chemical herbicide

Names
- Systematic IUPAC name 2-[[4,6-bis(difluoromethoxy)pyrimidin-2-yl]carbamoylsulfamoyl]benzoic acid

Identifiers
CAS Number	113036-87-6
3D model (JSmol)	Interactive image
ChEBI	CHEBI:82031
ChEMBL	ChEMBLCHEMBL2251449
ChemSpider	82871
KEGG	C18883
PubChem CID	91774
UNII	7UFU80LX99
CompTox Dashboard (EPA)	DTXSID40150270
- InChI: InChI=1S/C14H10F4N4O7S/c15-11(16)28-8-5-9(29-12(17)18)20-13(19-8)21-14(25)22-30(26,27)7-4-2-1-3-6(7)10(23)24/h1-5,11-12H,(H,23,24)(H2,19,20,21,22,25) Key: GPGLBXMQFQQXDV-UHFFFAOYSA-N
- SMILES: C1=CC=C(C(=C1)C(=O)O)S(=O)(=O)NC(=O)NC2=NC(=CC(=N2)OC(F)F)OC(F)F

Properties
Chemical formula	C_{14}H_{10}F_{4}N_{4}O_{7}S
Molar mass	454.31 g·mol^{−1}
Appearance	Colorless crystalline solid
Density	1.7 g/cm^{3}
Melting point	196 °C (385 °F; 469 K)
Solubility in water	7 mg/L

Hazards
Flash point	noncombustible
- Lethal dose or concentration (LD, LC)
LD_{50} (median dose)	5050 mg kg⁻¹
LC_{50} (median concentration)	4.8 mg l⁻¹ (inhalation)
- Except where otherwise noted, data are given for materials in their standard state (at 25 °C [77 °F], 100 kPa). Infobox references

Primisulfuron, commonly known under its trade name Beacon, is a chemical compound of the sulfonylurea class. Primisulfuron is mostly known for its use as a pesticide. It is primarily used as an herbicide, meaning that it is mainly used to kill weeds and grasses. Primisulfuron inhibits the plant enzyme ALS (acetolactate synthase), suppressing cell division.

In the early 1980s, herbicides that targeted ALS were among the most popular herbicides worldwide. Nowadays, primisulfuron is mainly used on corn and some types of weeds. Because of the high environmental risks associated with the use of primisulfuron, it is currently not approved for use by the European Union under EC 1107/2009. However, in certain areas of the United States it is permitted to use primisulfuron as a pesticide.

Plants can build up a resistance against primisulfuron, mostly by degrading it into non-toxic compounds. This can be done by chemically breaking it down or by metabolising it.

Primisulfuron's HRAC classification is Group B (global, Aus), Group 2 (numeric), as it inhibits acetohydroxyacid synthase.

== Use/purpose ==
Primisulfuron is a sulfonylurea herbicide mainly used on crops or near crops to limit grasses and a broad range of weeds from growing and competing with the crop. It was primarily developed for weed control on corn, being specifically sufficient against Sorghum weeds (Sorghum bicolor and Sorghum halepense), while at the same time being active against the persistent weed Couch Grass (Elymus repens). Next to this, with a higher dosage (still very low at 20g a.i./ha), Primisulfuron can also target some dicotyledonous weeds.

The use of primisulfuron is not limited to the pre-emergence of weeds, as intensive field testing has shown that primisulfuron is effective against perennial weeds. Furthermore, primisulfuron can even inhibit the growth in Sorghum propagated through rhizomes, demonstrating its effectiveness even further than just seed-grown sorghum. The specificity of the herbicide makes it ideal to be used after pre-emergence herbicides, thus targeting a wide range of weeds at different stages of growth.

=== Efficacy ===
Primisulfuron has a relatively slow activity, while further growth of weeds is discontinued immediately, the complete desiccation only occurs after 10-20 days under optimal conditions. The highest efficacy of primisulfuron is achieved by different methods depending on the type of weed. For Sorghum bicolor, the application of primisulfuron (at 10-20g a.i./ha) is optimal at early stages of growth (at about 10cm tall), while the weed is still small and actively growing. Sorghum halepense, however, is better controlled when the weed is 20-30cm. At this stage, the uptake and translocation of primisulfuron is more, and therefore can inhibit the growth better. Elymus repens has strong translocation properties, which makes primisulfuron very efficient when introduced. This again, has to be when the grass is more mature, at 10-20cm tall. For broadleaved weeds, the efficacy is a little bit less, showing about 80% control at 20 g a.i./ha after an early post-emergence. This data was obtained for: Xanthium spp., Amaranthus spp., Ambrosia spp., Datura spp. and most of the cruciferous weeds.

== Molecular Mechanism ==
Primisulfuron, like other herbicides, inhibits the enzyme acetolactate synthase (ALS). This enzyme is involved in the synthesis of amino acids in the group of so-called "branched chain amino acids" (BCAAs). This includes leucine, isoleucine, and valine of the non proteinogenic amino acids. ALS catalyzes two reactions of the total synthesis mechanism of these BCAAs. Namely the formation of 2-acetolactate from two pyruvate molecules in the leucine and valine forming mechanism, and the synthesis of 2-aceto-2-hydroxybutyrate from pyruvate and 2-ketobutyrate.

The inhibition of ALS has several effects, the most impactful effect being the depletion of the relative abundance of BCAAs in the total free amino acid pool. The deficiencies of BCAAs in turn decreases protein synthesis, which slows down cell division rate and eventually could lead to the death of a cell.

Studies have also shown several secondary effects of ALS inhibition; Buildup of 2-ketobutyrate and 2-aminobutyrate, depletion of intermediates in pathways of critical processes and the disruption of photosynthesis.

== Breakdown ==
=== Chemical breakdown ===
The resistance of plants against primisulfuron depends on how fast they can excrete or convert primisulfuron into non-toxic compounds. Multiple studies found that primisulfuron is relatively stable around a neutral pH, but is readily hydrolysed in acidic environments. In this reaction, the primisulfuron is converted into 2-(aminosulfonyl)benzoic acid, 2-amino-4,6-(difluorometh oxy)pyrimidine and carbon dioxide.

In acidic conditions this reactions occurs quite readily where primisulfuron has a half time of 3.106 days (pH=4), whereas for neutral conditions the half time is 1086 days (pH=7), and for alkaline conditions the half time is 418.6 days (pH=10). This means that in acidic soils the primisulfuron will be broken down much faster than in neutral or alkaline soils.

Besides (acidic) hydrolysis primisulfuron can be broken down by UV-irridation as well as depicted in the figure below.

Irrididation of primisulforun by light of 366 and 300 nm at a pH of 7 showed no significant change in concentration of primisulfuron. But when light of 254 nm was used the degradation of primisulfuron occurred quite readily with a half time of 10.0 minutes (pH=7).

=== Biological metabolism ===
Besides chemical breakdown primisulfuron can also be metabolised. One instance of this is shown in corn plants where primisulfuron is metabolized into hydroxypyrimidine and hydroxybenzoic acid by Cytochrome P450. Cytochrome P450 is a class of enzymes which is a so-called monooxygenase; meaning that P450 can incorporate hydroxyl groups into substrates (like Primisulfuron). Via this reaction the phenyl and pyrimidine group of Primisulfuron are hydrolysed intro hydroxypyrimidine and hydroxybenzoic acid.

== Toxicity ==
Chemical structure of primisulfuron methyl

The effects of primisulfuron on the environment and human body are poorly understood since little to no research has been conducted here. However, this research has been done on primisulfuron methyl which is a chemical extremely similar to primisulfuron.

Primisulfuron methyl is not a toxic substance to humans and also not considered to accumulate in the human body. This has been concluded from experiments with rats where the LD_{50} is >5.050 mg/kg for oral exposure and > 2.010 mg/kg for dermal exposure. However, it is very toxic to aquatic life with an EC50 of 0.098mg/l (96 h) for algae and a LC50 of 210.0 mg/l (96 h) for rainbow trout.

Based on these findings and the similarities between primisulfuron and primisulfuron methyl, it is likely that primisulfuron is only toxic to aquatic life and not to humans. However, since no research was conducted on primisulfuron, this cannot be said with complete confidence.
