= FNRS =

FNRS may refer to:

- FnrS RNA
- National Fund for Scientific Research (French: Fonds National de la Recherche Scientifique), in Belgium

== See also ==
- FNR (disambiguation)
