= Glyclopyramide =

Chemical compound

Clinical data
- Routes of administration: Oral
- ATC code: none

Legal status
- Legal status: In general: ℞ (Prescription only)

Identifiers
- IUPAC name: 4-chloro-N-[(pyrrolidin-1-ylamino)carbonyl]benzenesulfonamide
- CAS Number: 631-27-6
- PubChem CID: 71793
- ChemSpider: 64820
- UNII: KE474IKG1W
- KEGG: D01799
- ChEMBL: ChEMBL2105083
- CompTox Dashboard (EPA): DTXSID2048822

Chemical and physical data
- Formula: C_{11}H_{14}ClN_{3}O_{3}S
- Molar mass: 303.76 g·mol^{−1}
- 3D model (JSmol): Interactive image
- SMILES: C1CCN(C1)NC(=O)NS(=O)(=O)C2=CC=C(C=C2)Cl
- InChI: InChI=1S/C11H14ClN3O3S/c12-9-3-5-10(6-4-9)19(17,18)14-11(16)13-15-7-1-2-8-15/h3-6H,1-2,7-8H2,(H2,13,14,16); Key:HNSCCNJWTJUGNQ-UHFFFAOYSA-N

Glyclopyramide (INN, marketed under the tradename Deamelin-S) is a sulfonylurea drug used in the treatment of diabetes. It has been marketed in Japan since 1965.

It is classified as second generation.
