= Metsulfuron-methyl =

Chemical compound

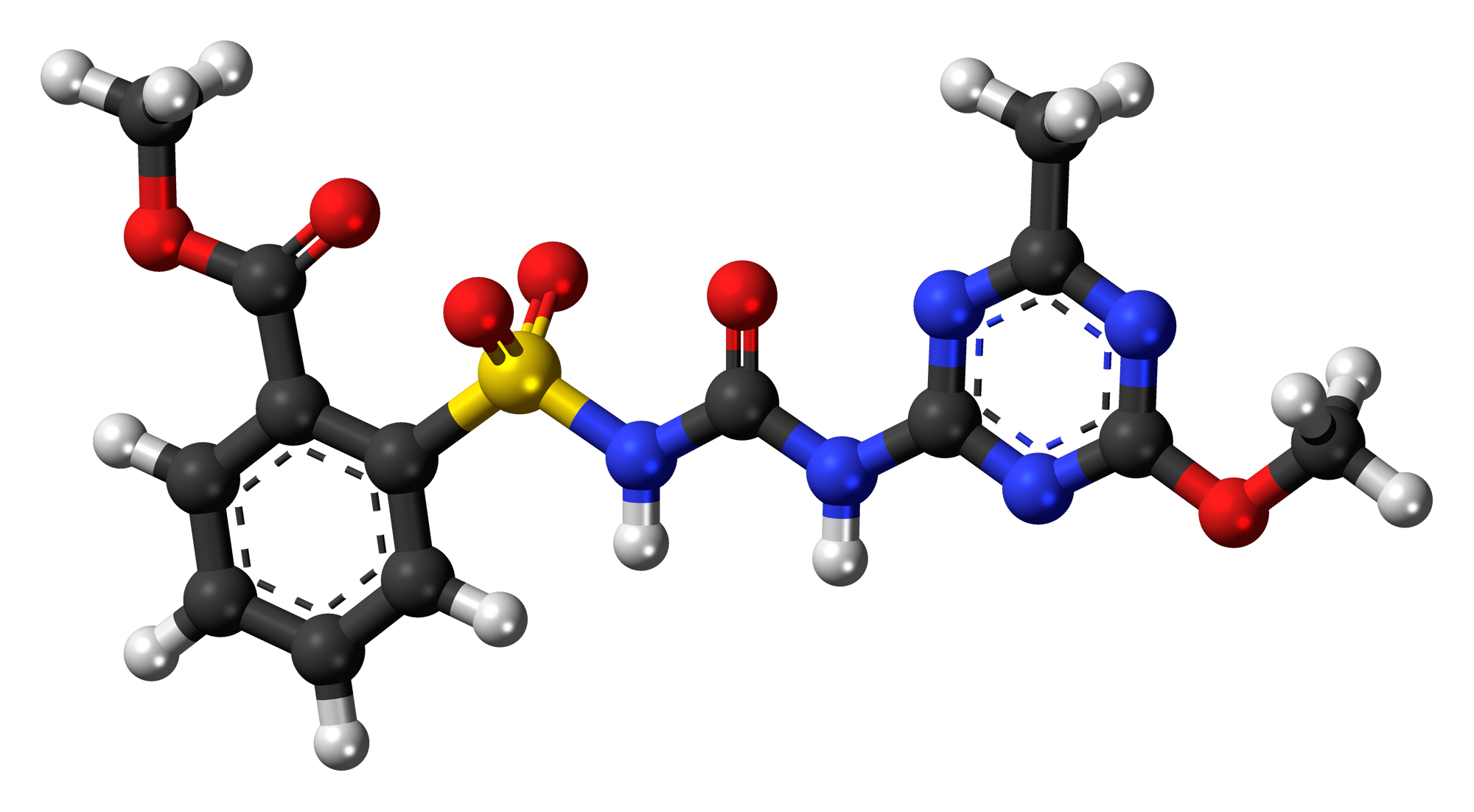

Names
- IUPAC name 2-{[(4-methoxy-6-methyl-1,3,5-triazin-2-yl)amino]-oxomethyl]sulfamoyl}benzoic acid methyl ester

Identifiers
| CAS Number | 74223-64-6 |
| 3D model (JSmol) | Interactive image |
| ChEBI | CHEBI:39678 |
| ChemSpider | 47883 |
| ECHA InfoCard | 100.129.351 |
| KEGG | C10946 |
| PubChem CID | 52999 |
| UNII | 2589ET7417 |
| CompTox Dashboard (EPA) | DTXSID6023864 |
- InChI: InChI=1S/C14H15N5O6S/c1-8-15-12(18-14(16-8)25-3)17-13(21)19-26(22,23)10-7-5-4-6-9(10)11(20)24-2/h4-7H,1-3H3,(H2,15,16,17,18,19,21) Key: RSMUVYRMZCOLBH-UHFFFAOYSA-N; InChI=1/C14H15N5O6S/c1-8-15-12(18-14(16-8)25-3)17-13(21)19-26(22,23)10-7-5-4-6-9(10)11(20)24-2/h4-7H,1-3H3,(H2,15,16,17,18,19,21) Key: RSMUVYRMZCOLBH-UHFFFAOYAU
- SMILES: CC1=NC(=NC(=N1)OC)NC(=O)NS(=O)(=O)C2=CC=CC=C2C(=O)OC

Properties
| Chemical formula | C_{14}H_{15}N_{5}O_{6}S |
| Molar mass | 381.36 g/mol |
| Density | 1.45 g/cm^{3} |
| Melting point | 163-166 °C |
- Except where otherwise noted, data are given for materials in their standard state (at 25 °C [77 °F], 100 kPa). verify (what is ?) Infobox references

Metsulfuron-methyl is an organic compound classified as a sulfonylurea herbicide, which kills broadleaf weeds and some annual grasses. It is a systemic compound with foliar and soil activity, that inhibits cell division in shoots and roots. It has residual activity in soils, allowing it to be used infrequently but requiring up to 22 months before planting certain crops (sunflowers, flax, corn, or safflower). It has very low toxicity to mammals, birds, fish, and insects but is a moderate eye irritant.

Metsulfuron-methyl's HRAC classification is Group B (global, Aus), Group 2 (numeric), as it inhibits acetohydroxyacid synthase.
