= Nik operon =

The nik operon is an operon required for uptake of nickel ions into the cell. It is present in many bacteria, but has been extensively studied in Helicobacter pylori. Nickel is an essential nutrient for many microorganisms, where it participates in a variety of cellular processes. However, excessive levels of nickel ions in cell can be fatal to the cell. Nickel ion concentration in the cell is regulated through the nik operon.

== Structure of the nik operon ==
The nik operon consists of six genes. The first five genes nikABCDE encode components of a typical ABC transport system and the last gene nikR encodes a DNA-binding protein that represses transcription of nikABCDE when sufficient Ni^{2+} is present. The nikR gene is located 5 bp downstream of the end of nikE, transcribed in the same direction as nikABCDE. The following table summarizes the structure of the nik operon:

Gene	Protein encoded	Functional Role
nikA	ABC transporter Ni^{2+}binding component	binds Ni^{2+} in the periplasm and transfers it to the permease; may also play a role in chemotaxis away from toxic concentrations of nickel
nikB & nikC	ABC transporter permease components	transport of Ni^{2+}+ across the inner membrane
nikD & nikE	ABC transporter ATP-binding components	hydrolyzes ATP to provide energy for the transport process
nikR	transcriptional regulator of the nikABCDE operon	downregulates expression of the nik operon in the presence of excess Ni^{2+} ions

== Regulation ==
=== nikR Regulation ===
Regulation of expression of the nikR gene is achieved by two promoters. The first is through the FNR regulon. The FNR controlled regulation of nikABCDE–nikR occurs at a FNR box located upstream of nikA at a putative NikR binding site. The second promoter element regulating nikR expression occurs 51 bp upstream of the nikR transcription start site and results in low-level constitutive expression. There is also evidence that nikR expression is partially autoregulated.

=== Regulation of Ni^{2+} uptake ===
Ni^{2+} is taken up into prokaryotic cells by one of two types of high-affinity transport systems. The first method involves ABC-type transporters (discussed in this article) and the second mechanism makes use of transition-metal permeases (such as HoxN of Ralstonia eutropha). The ABC-type transporter system consists of five proteins, NikA–E, that carry out the ATP-dependent transport of Ni^{2+}. NikA is a soluble, periplasmic, Ni-binding protein; NikB and NikC form a transmembrane pore for passage of Ni; and NikD and NikE hydrolyze ATP and couple this energy to Ni^{2+}-transport. When Ni^{2+} is available in excess, NikR protein represses transcription of nikABCDE.

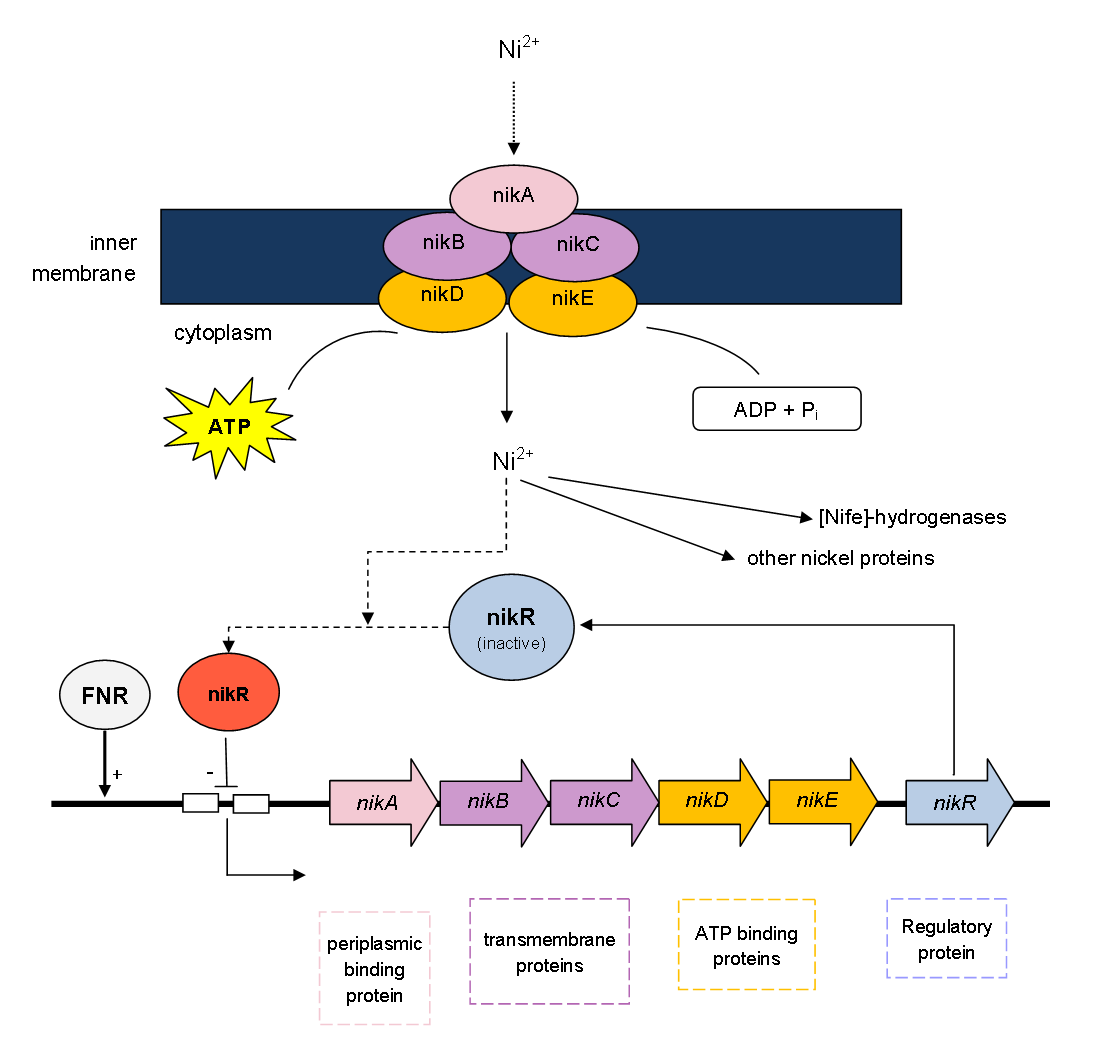
Regulation of nickel ion uptake by components of the nik operon

== Repression by NikR binding ==
Using profile-based sequence database searches, NikR was shown to be a member of the ribbon-helix-helix (RHH) family of transcription factors. It has been demonstrated that the N-terminal domain of NikR is responsible for binding to DNA and that it only binds in presence of Ni^{2+}. NikR has two sites for binding to Ni^{2+} ions. Binding of Ni^{2+} at concentrations that allow full occupancy of only the high-affinity sites is sufficient for operator binding, but the affinity for the operator is increased 1000-fold and the operator footprints are larger when both nickel-binding sites are occupied. These results, combined with estimates of intracellular Ni^{2+} and NikR concentrations, lead to the conclusion that NikR is able to sense Ni^{2+} and regulate the nik operon expression over a range of intracellular Ni^{2+} concentrations from as low as one to as high as 10,000 molecules per cell.

== See also ==
- gene regulation
- Operon
- lac operon
