= Acetolactate decarboxylase =

Class of enzymes

Identifiers
- EC no.: 4.1.1.5
- CAS no.: 9025-02-9

Databases
- BRENDA: enzyme data
- ExPASy: NiceZyme view
- KEGG: enzyme entry
- MetaCyc: metabolic pathway
- Rhea: reactions
- PDB structures: RCSB PDB PDBe PDBsum
- Gene Ontology: AmiGO / QuickGO
Search
- PMC: articles
- PubMed: articles
- NCBI: proteins

Acetolactate decarboxylase (EC 4.1.1.5) is an enzyme characterised from Aerobacter aerogenes that catalyzes the decarboxylation of acetolactic acid to (R)-acetoin:

acetolactic acid
CO_{2}
(R)-acetoin

The enzyme converts both enantiomers of acetolactic acid to the chiral (R) isomer of acetoin. The enzyme is used in brewing, where it is used to control levels of diacetyl.

This enzyme is a lyase, specifically a carboxy-lyases, which cleave carbon-carbon bonds. The systematic name of this enzyme class is (S)-2-hydroxy-2-methyl-3-oxobutanoate carboxy-lyase [(R)-2-acetoin-forming]. Other names in common use include alpha-acetolactate decarboxylase, and (S)-2-hydroxy-2-methyl-3-oxobutanoate carboxy-lyase.

== Structural studies ==
As of late 2007, only one structure has been solved for this class of enzymes, with the PDB accession code PDB: 1XV2.
