= Ketol-acid reductoisomerase =

Class of enzymes

ketol-acid reductoisomerase
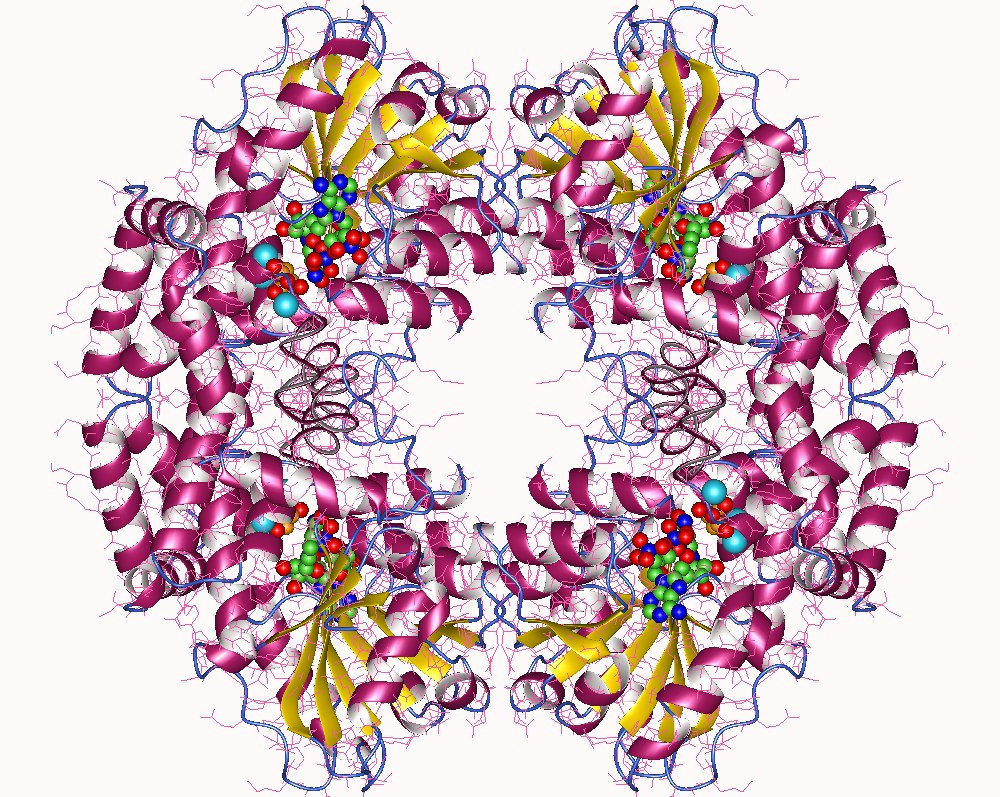
- Ketol-acid reductoisomerase tetramer, Alicyclobacillus acidocaldarius

Identifiers
- EC no.: 1.1.1.86
- CAS no.: 9075-02-9

Databases
- IntEnz: IntEnz view
- BRENDA: BRENDA entry
- ExPASy: NiceZyme view
- KEGG: KEGG entry
- MetaCyc: metabolic pathway
- PRIAM: profile
- PDB structures: RCSB PDB PDBe PDBsum
- Gene Ontology: AmiGO / QuickGO
Search
- PMC: articles
- PubMed: articles
- NCBI: proteins

In enzymology, ketol-acid reductoisomerase (EC 1.1.1.86) is an enzyme that catalyzes the chemical reaction

(R)-2,3-dihydroxy-3-methylbutanoic acid
+ NADP^{+}
H^{+}
H^{+}
acetolactic acid
+ NADPH

The two substrates of this enzyme are (R)-2,3-dihydroxy-3-methylbutanoic acid and oxidised nicotinamide adenine dinucleotide phosphate (NADP^{+}). Its products are acetolactic acid, NADPH, and a proton.

This enzyme belongs to the family of oxidoreductases, specifically those acting on the CH-OH group of donor with NAD^{+} or NADP^{+} as acceptor. The systematic name of this enzyme class is (R)-2,3-dihydroxy-3-methylbutanoate:NADP^{+} oxidoreductase (isomerizing). Other names in common use include dihydroxyisovalerate dehydrogenase (isomerizing), acetohydroxy acid isomeroreductase, ketol acid reductoisomerase, alpha-keto-beta-hydroxylacyl reductoisomerase, 2-hydroxy-3-keto acid reductoisomerase, acetohydroxy acid reductoisomerase, acetolactate reductoisomerase, dihydroxyisovalerate (isomerizing) dehydrogenase, isomeroreductase, and reductoisomerase. This enzyme participates in valine, leucine and isoleucine biosynthesis and pantothenate and coa biosynthesis.

== Structural studies ==
As of late 2007, 4 structures have been solved for this class of enzymes, with PDB accession codes 1NP3, 1QMG, 1YRL, and 1YVE.
