= Acetolactic acid =

α-Acetolactic acid

Names
- Preferred IUPAC name (2S)-2-Hydroxy-2-methyl-3-oxobutanoic acid

Identifiers
CAS Number	71698-08-3
3D model (JSmol)	Interactive image
ChEBI	CHEBI:18409
ChemSpider	389710
PubChem CID	440878
UNII	RTS9ADR29A
CompTox Dashboard (EPA)	DTXSID70331535
- InChI: InChI=1S/C5H8O4/c1-3(6)5(2,9)4(7)8/h9H,1-2H3,(H,7,8)/t5-/m0/s1 Key: NMDWGEGFJUBKLB-YFKPBYRVSA-N; InChI=1S/C5H8O4/c1-3(6)5(2,9)4(7)8/h9H,1-2H3,(H,7,8)/t5-/m0/s1
- SMILES: O=C(C)[C@](O)(C(=O)O)C

Properties
Chemical formula	C_{5}H_{8}O_{4}
Molar mass	132.115 g·mol^{−1}
- Except where otherwise noted, data are given for materials in their standard state (at 25 °C [77 °F], 100 kPa). verify (what is ?) Infobox references

α-Acetolactic acid is a precursor in the biosynthesis of the branched chain amino acids valine and leucine. α-Acetolactic acid is produced from two molecules of pyruvic acid by acetolactate synthase. α-Acetolactic acid can also be decarboxylated by alpha-acetolactate decarboxylase to produce acetoin. The name α-acetolactate is used for anion (conjugate base), salts, and esters of α-acetolactic acid.
