= Glipizide =

Chemical compound

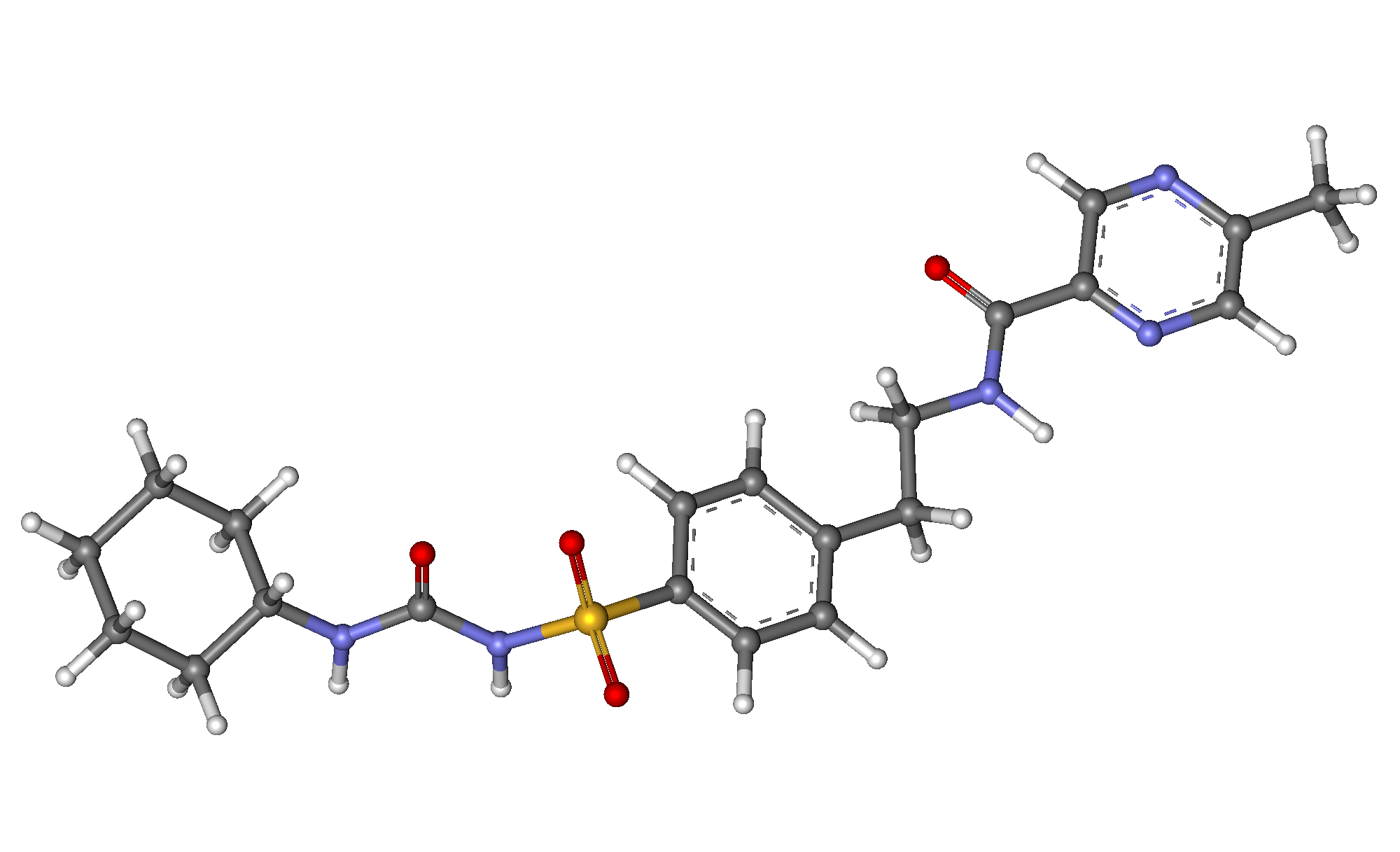

Clinical data
- Trade names: Glucotrol, Glucotrol XL, others
- AHFS/Drugs.com: Monograph
- MedlinePlus: a684060
- License data: US DailyMed: Glipizide
- Pregnancy category: AU: C
- Routes of administration: By mouth
- Drug class: Sulfonylurea
- ATC code: A10BB07 (WHO)

Legal status
- Legal status: UK: POM (Prescription only); US: ℞-only

Pharmacokinetic data
- Bioavailability: 100% (regular formulation); 90% (extended release)
- Protein binding: 98 to 99%
- Metabolism: Liver hydroxylation
- Elimination half-life: 2 to 5 hours
- Excretion: Kidney and fecal

Identifiers
- IUPAC name: N-(4-[N-(cyclohexylcarbamoyl)sulfamoyl]phenethyl)-5-methylpyrazine-2-carboxamide
- CAS Number: 29094-61-9
- PubChem CID: 3478
- IUPHAR/BPS: 6821
- DrugBank: DB01067
- ChemSpider: 3359
- UNII: X7WDT95N5C
- KEGG: D00335
- ChEBI: CHEBI:5384
- ChEMBL: ChEMBL1073
- CompTox Dashboard (EPA): DTXSID0040676
- ECHA InfoCard: 100.044.919

Chemical and physical data
- Formula: C_{21}H_{27}N_{5}O_{4}S
- Molar mass: 445.54 g·mol^{−1}
- 3D model (JSmol): Interactive image
- Melting point: 208 to 209 °C (406 to 408 °F)
- SMILES: O=C(c1ncc(nc1)C)NCCc2ccc(cc2)S(=O)(=O)NC(=O)NC3CCCCC3
- InChI: InChI=1S/C21H27N5O4S/c1-15-13-24-19(14-23-15)20(27)22-12-11-16-7-9-18(10-8-16)31(29,30)26-21(28)25-17-5-3-2-4-6-17/h7-10,13-14,17H,2-6,11-12H2,1H3,(H,22,27)(H2,25,26,28); Key:ZJJXGWJIGJFDTL-UHFFFAOYSA-N

Glipizide, sold under the brand name Glucotrol among others, is an anti-diabetic medication of the sulfonylurea class used to treat type 2 diabetes. It is used together with a diabetic diet and exercise. It is not indicated for use by itself in type 1 diabetes. It is taken by mouth. Effects generally begin within half an hour and can last for up to a day.

Common side effects include nausea, diarrhea, low blood sugar, and headache. Other side effects include sleepiness, skin rash, and shakiness. The dose may need to be adjusted in those with liver or kidney disease. Use during pregnancy or breastfeeding is not recommended. It works by stimulating the pancreas to release insulin and increases tissue sensitivity to insulin.

Glipizide was approved for medical use in the United States in 1984. It is available as a generic medication. In 2023, it was the 42nd most commonly prescribed medication in the United States, with more than 15 million prescriptions.

== Mechanism of action ==
Glipizide sensitizes the beta cells of pancreatic islets of Langerhans insulin response, meaning that more insulin is released in response to glucose than would be without glipizide ingestion. Glipizide acts by partially blocking potassium channels among beta cells of pancreatic islets of Langerhans. By blocking potassium channels, the cell depolarizes, which results in the opening of voltage-gated calcium channels. The resulting calcium influx encourages insulin release from beta cells.

== History ==
It was patented in 1969, and approved for medical use in 1971. Glipizide was approved for medical use in the United States in 1984.

== Synthesis ==
Synthesis of glipizide: Alternative: Cmp#3: Related article:

5-Methylpyrazine-2-carboxylic acid [5521-55-1] (1) is converted to its acid chloride. A Schotten-Baumann reaction is then performed with 4-(2-aminoethyl)benzene sulfonamide [35303-76-5] (2) to give the corresponding amide PC9883549 [33288-71-0] (3). This forms glipizide on reaction with cyclohexylisocyanide and base in acetone.
