= FNR regulon =

The fnr (fumarate and nitrate reductase) gene of Escherichia coli encodes a transcriptional activator (FNR) which is required for the expression of a number of genes involved in anaerobic respiratory pathways. The FNR (defective in fumarate and nitrate reduction) protein of E. coli is an oxygen – responsive transcriptional regulator required for the switch from aerobic to anaerobic metabolism.

"Type III mutants, originally frdB, were designated fnr because they were defective in fumarate and nitrate reduction and impaired in their ability to produce gas." - Lambden and Guest, 1976 Journal of General Microbiology 97, 145-160

The fnr gene is expressed under both aerobic and anaerobic conditions and is subject to autoregulation and repression by glucose, particularly during anaerobic growth.

The functional state of FNR is determined by a (rapid) inactivation of FNR by O_{2}, and a slow (constant) reactivation with glutathione as the reducing agent.

== Regulation of FNR by oxygen ==
Only if neither O2 nor nitrate are available, fumarate reductase and the fermentative enzymes are synthesized. The switch from aerobic to nitrate and fumarate respiration or fermentation corresponds to a progressive decrease in ATP yields. This regulation ensures preferential use of electron acceptors with high ATP yields, and is effected by regulators responding to O_{2}, nitrate and fumarate.

=== Presence of oxygen ===
The sensory domain of FNR contains a Fe-S cluster, which is of the [4Fe-4S]^{2+} type under anaerobic conditions. Oxygen is supplied to the cytoplasmic FNR by diffusion and inactivates FNR by direct interaction. The Fe-S cluster is converted to [3Fe-4S]^{+} or a [2Fe-4S]^{+} by oxygen, resulting in FNR inactivation. After prolonged incubation with oxygen, the Fe-S cluster is destroyed by conversion to [2Fe-2S] cluster and finally to apoFNR.

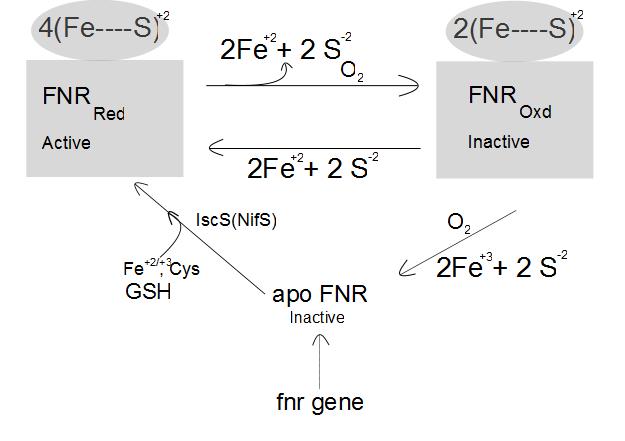
Regulation of FNR by Oxygen

=== Absence of oxygen ===
Interconversion of active and inactive FNR is a reversible process. The oxygen-sensing domain of FNR contains a surface-exposed Fe-S cluster, which can react with cellular reductants, such as glutathione or thiol proteins. The IscS isoenzyme (iscS gene) is one of the most important requirements for formation of [4Fe–4S].FNR in vivo. The formation of [4Fe–4S] FNR from apoFNR is part of de novo synthesis of active FNR. The reaction requires cysteine desulphurase which catalyzes desulphuration of the cysteine providing HS- (presumably via enzyme bound persulphide) for the FeS cluster formation. Whether glutathione supports also the conversion of [2Fe–2S] FNR to [4Fe–4S] FNR is not known. Under anoxic conditions, the [4Fe-4S] FNR, bound to 4 cysteine residues binds to DNA target sites, and controls the expression of corresponding genes. The DNA target sequence called the Fnr box has the following consensus sequence TTGATNNNNATCAA and is located upstream of the Fnr-dependent genes and operons. Under low oxygen the FNR dimer of E. coli recognizes this sequence and acts as a transcriptional activator.

Oxygen is the actual signal for FNR whereas; reduction serves as a constant reversal of FNR to the active state. However, the inactivation of FNR requires only an oxidizing agent, and not necessarily oxygen itself. Ferricyanide is able, in vivo and in vitro, to promote inactivation of FNR function or [4Fe–4S].FNR destruction by means of oxidizing the cluster.

== Genes regulated by FNR ==
FNR represents the master-switch which ensures that aerobic respiration is used in preference to anaerobic respiratory metabolism or fermentation, simply because important anaerobic genes are not expressed unless FNR is in its active (anaerobic) form. FNR is a very important transcriptional factor that is involved in the regulation of synthesis of many genes. Important groups of FNR-regulated genes of E. coli

Function of gene products	Example
Respiratory enzymes	anoxic, oxic Fumarate reductase (frdABCD)
Transmembrane carriers	Nitrite efflux (narK )
Anaerobic catabolism	fermentation Pyruvate formate-lyase (pflA)
Gene regulators	ArcA, FNR, (NarX)

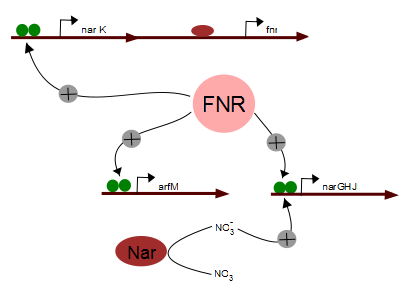
Regulation of Nar and arfM gene by FNR(activated)

Active FNR protein activates and represses target genes in response to anaerobiosis. It also represses the aerobic genes, cytochrome d and o oxidase, and NADH dehydrogenase II. It acts as a positive regulator of genes expressed under anaerobic fermentative conditions such as aspartase, formate hydrogenase, fumarate reductase, and pyruvate formate lyase.

=== Regulation of ArcA system ===
Arc A is regulated by FNR in anaerobic conditions. Anaerobic activation of arcA transcription is increased three- to fourfold in the presence of Fnr. The arcA upstream regulatory region contains five putative promoter sequences and a putative Fnr-binding site. Identification of the transcription start sites indicates that transcription occurs in aerobiosis from three constitutive upstream promoters (P_{e}, P_{d}, P_{c}). In anaerobiosis an additional completely Fnr-dependent transcript starting at P_{a}, is present. Both of these genes then negatively regulate the sodA gene, coding for manganese superoxide dismutase.

=== Regulation of NarX/NarL system ===
The fnr gene product, a pleiotropic transcriptional activator, is required for expression of the operons that encode nitrate and fumarate reductase complexes. FNR, an efficient respiratory oxidant induces synthesis of nitrate respiratory enzymes and simultaneously represses synthesis of enzymes for respiring the lower-potential acceptors.

In Escherichia coli, the anaerobic expression of genes encoding the nitrate (narGHJI) and dimethyl sulphoxide (dmsABC) terminal reductases is stimulated by the global anaerobic regulator- FNR. The ability of FNR to activate transcription initiation has been proposed to be dependent on protein–protein interactions between RNA polymerase and two activating regions (AR) of FNR, FNR-AR1 and FNR-AR3. Also, in the presence of activated narL, the effect of FNR binding to the RNAP is decreased greatly.

== Eukaryotic system having a homologue to FNR ==
In Fusarium oxysporum, a member of the fungi family, contains a unique cytochrome P-450, whose genes when sequenced, exhibited the same sequence as the binding site of FNR, a DNA-binding, O2 -sensor protein that positively regulates expressions of hypoxic sites in E. coli. These results raise the interesting possibility that the expression of the fungal denitrification system is also regulated, by a set of mechanisms, i.e., a combination of an FNR-like system and a system responding to nitrate/ nitrite.
