= Gliclazide =

Chemical compound

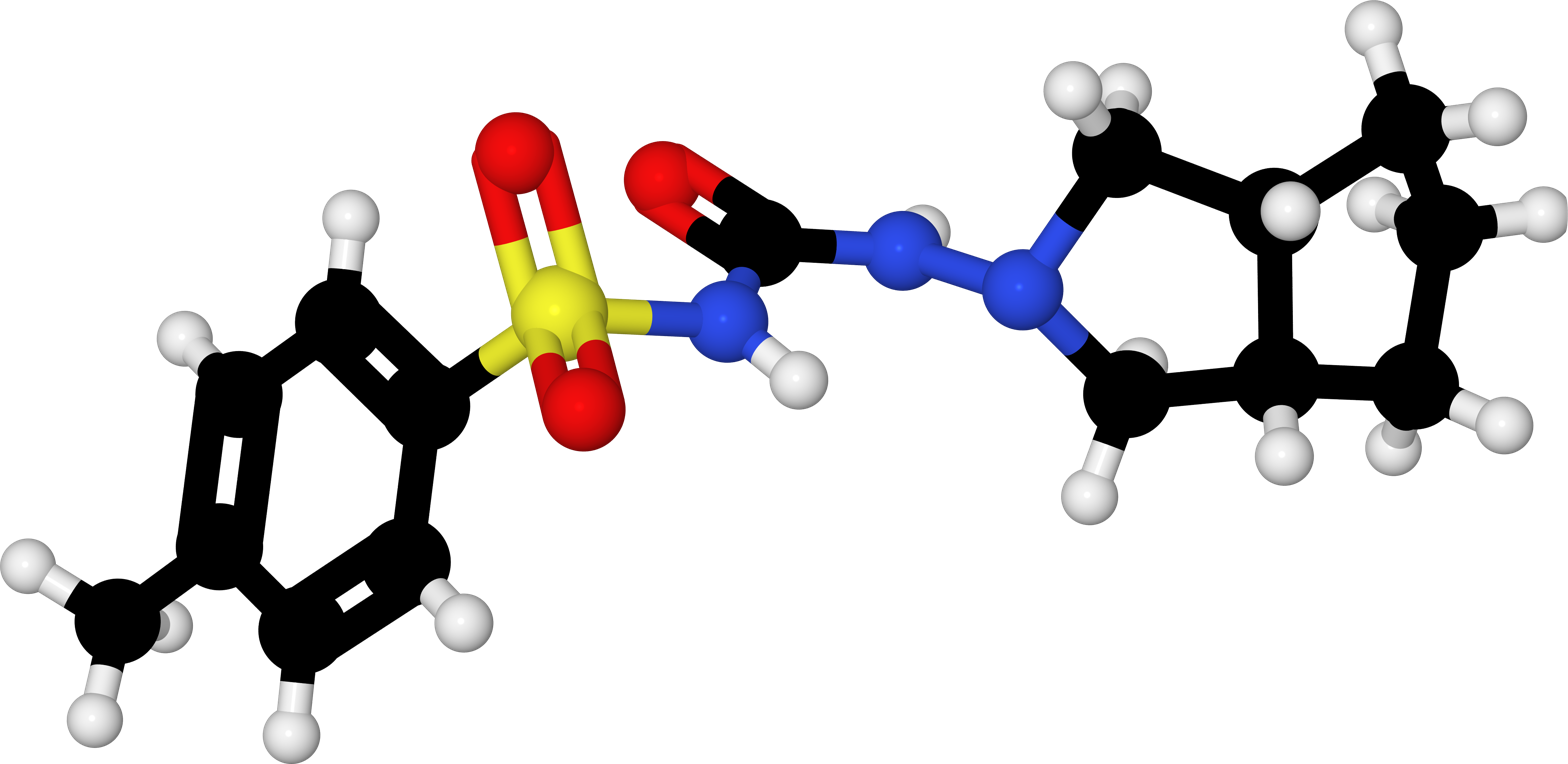

Clinical data
- Trade names: Diamicron, Diaprel, Azukon, others
- AHFS/Drugs.com: Micromedex Detailed Consumer Information
- Pregnancy category: AU: C
- Routes of administration: By mouth
- ATC code: A10BB09 (WHO)

Legal status
- Legal status: AU: S4 (Prescription only); CA: ℞-only; UK: POM (Prescription only)

Pharmacokinetic data
- Elimination half-life: 10.4 hours

Identifiers
- IUPAC name: N-(hexahydrocyclopenta[c]pyrrol-2(1H)-ylcarbamoyl)-4-methylbenzenesulfonamide
- CAS Number: 21187-98-4
- PubChem CID: 3475
- DrugBank: DB01120
- ChemSpider: 3356
- UNII: G4PX8C4HKV
- KEGG: D01599
- ChEBI: CHEBI:31654
- ChEMBL: ChEMBL427216
- CompTox Dashboard (EPA): DTXSID9023095
- ECHA InfoCard: 100.040.221

Chemical and physical data
- Formula: C_{15}H_{21}N_{3}O_{3}S
- Molar mass: 323.41 g·mol^{−1}
- 3D model (JSmol): Interactive image
- Melting point: 180 to 182 °C (356 to 360 °F)
- SMILES: O=S(=O)(c1ccc(cc1)C)NC(=O)NN3CC2CCCC2C3
- InChI: InChI=1S/C15H21N3O3S/c1-11-5-7-14(8-6-11)22(20,21)17-15(19)16-18-9-12-3-2-4-13(12)10-18/h5-8,12-13H,2-4,9-10H2,1H3,(H2,16,17,19); Key:BOVGTQGAOIONJV-UHFFFAOYSA-N

Gliclazide, sold under the brand name Diamicron among others, is a sulfonylurea type of anti-diabetic medication, used to treat type 2 diabetes. It is used when dietary changes, exercise, and weight loss are not enough. It is taken by mouth.

Side effect may include low blood sugar, vomiting, abdominal pain, rash, and liver problems. Use by those with significant kidney problems or liver problems or who are pregnant is not recommended. Gliclazide is in the sulfonylurea family of medications. It works mostly by increasing the release of insulin.

Gliclazide was patented in 1966 and approved for medical use in 1972. It is on the World Health Organization's List of Essential Medicines. It is not available for sale in the United States.

== Medical uses ==
Gliclazide is used for control of hyperglycemia in gliclazide-responsive diabetes mellitus of stable, mild, non-ketosis prone, type 2 diabetes. It is used when diabetes cannot be controlled by proper dietary management and exercise and when metformin has already been tried.

National Kidney Foundation (2012 Update) claims that Gliclazide does not require dosage up titration even in end stage kidney disease.

== Contraindications ==
- Type 1 diabetes
- Hypersensitivity to sulfonylureas
- Severe renal or hepatic failure (But relatively useful in mild renal impairment e.g. CKD stage 3)
- Pregnancy and lactation

== Adverse effects ==
Common adverse effects over 10%:

- Hypoglycemia (11 - 12%) - while it was shown to have the same efficacy as glimepiride, one of the newer sulfonylureas, the European GUIDE study has shown that it has approximately 50% less hypoglycemic confirmed episodes in comparison with glimepiride.

Uncommon adverse effects between 1 - 10%:

- Hypertension (3 - 4% incidence)
- Dizziness (2% incidence)
- Hyperglycemia (2% incidence)
- Viral infection (6 - 8% incidence)
- Back pain (4 - 5% incidence)

Rare adverse effects (under 1%):

- cystitis
- weight gain
- vomiting

== Interactions ==
Hyperglycemic action may be caused by danazol, chlorpromazine, glucocorticoids, progestogens, or β-2 agonists. Its hypoglycemic action may be potentiated by phenylbutazone, alcohol, fluconazole, β-blockers, and possibly ACE inhibitors. It has been found that rifampin increases gliclazide metabolism in humans in vivo.

== Overdose ==
Gliclazide overdose may cause severe hypoglycemia, requiring urgent administration of glucose by IV and Monitoring.

== Mechanism of action ==
Gliclazide selectively binds to sulfonylurea receptors (SUR-1) on the surface of the pancreatic beta-cells. It was shown to provide cardiovascular protection as it does not bind to sulfonylurea receptors (SUR-2A) in the heart. This binding effectively closes these K^{+} ion channels. This decreases the efflux of potassium from the cell which leads to the depolarization of the cell. This causes voltage dependent Ca^{2+} ion channels to open increasing the Ca^{2+} influx. The calcium can then bind to and activate calmodulin which in turn leads to exocytosis of insulin vesicles leading to insulin release.

The mouse model of Maturity-onset diabetes of the young (MODY) diabetes suggested that the reduced gliclazide clearance stands behind their therapeutic success in human MODY patients, but Urbanova et al. found that human MODY patients respond differently and that there was no consistent decrease in gliclazide clearance in randomly selected HNF1A-MODY and HNF4A-MODY patients.

Its classification has been ambiguous, as literature uses it as both a first-generation and second-generation sulfonylurea.

== Properties ==
According to the Biopharmaceutical Classification System (BCS), gliclazide falls under the BCS Class II drug, which is poorly soluble and highly permeable.

Water solubility = 0.027mg/L

- Hypoglycemic sulfonylurea, restoring first peak of insulin secretion, increasing insulin Sensitivity.
- No active circulating metabolites.

== Metabolism ==
Gliclazide undergoes extensive metabolism to several inactive metabolites in human beings, mainly methylhydroxygliclazide and carboxygliclazide. CYP2C9 is involved in the formation of hydroxygliclazide in human liver microsomes and in a panel of recombinant human P450s in vitro. But the pharmacokinetics of gliclazide MR are affected mainly by CYP2C19 genetic polymorphism instead of CYP2C9 genetic polymorphism.
