= Dihydroxy-acid dehydratase =

dihydroxy-acid dehydratase

Identifiers
- EC no.: 4.2.1.9
- CAS no.: 9024-32-2

Databases
- IntEnz: IntEnz view
- BRENDA: BRENDA entry
- ExPASy: NiceZyme view
- KEGG: KEGG entry
- MetaCyc: metabolic pathway
- PRIAM: profile
- PDB structures: RCSB PDB PDBe PDBsum
- Gene Ontology: AmiGO / QuickGO
Search
- PMC: articles
- PubMed: articles
- NCBI: proteins

The enzyme dihydroxy-acid dehydratase (EC 4.2.1.9) catalyzes the chemical reaction

2,3-dihydroxy-3-methylbutanoate $\rightleftharpoons$ 3-methyl-2-oxobutanoate + H_{2}O

This enzyme participates in valine, leucine and isoleucine biosynthesis and pantothenate and coenzyme A (CoA) biosynthesis.

== Nomenclature ==
This enzyme belongs to the family of lyases, specifically the hydro-lyases, which cleave carbon-oxygen bonds. The systematic name of this enzyme class is 2,3-dihydroxy-3-methylbutanoate hydro-lyase (3-methyl-2-oxobutanoate-forming). Other names in common use include

- acetohydroxyacid dehydratase,
- α,β-dihydroxyacid dehydratase,
- 2,3-dihydroxyisovalerate dehydratase,
- α,β-dihydroxyisovalerate dehydratase,
- dihydroxy acid dehydrase,
- DHAD,
- and 2,3-dihydroxy-acid hydro-lyase.
