= Tolazamide =

Chemical compound

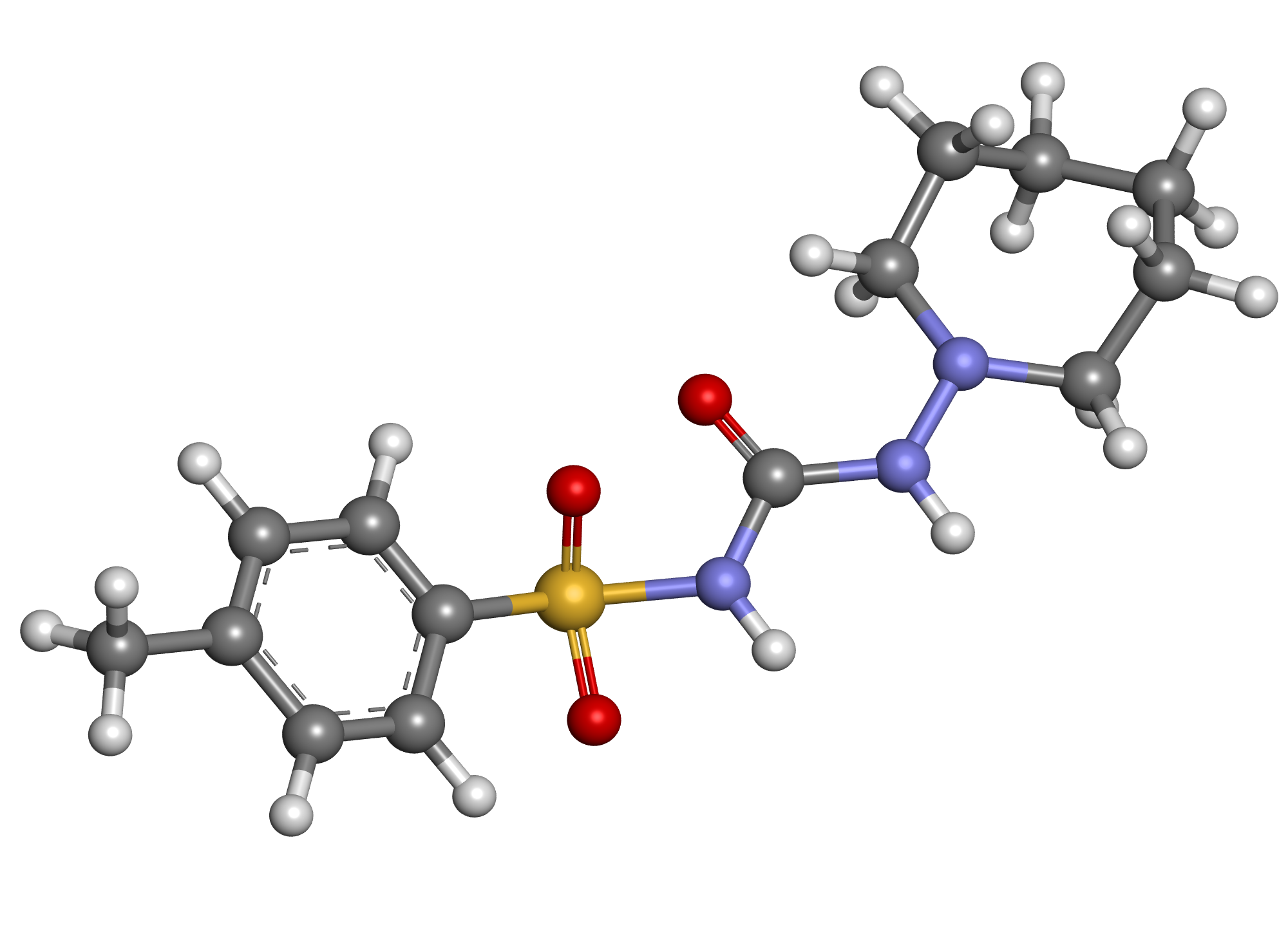

Clinical data
- Trade names: Tolinase
- AHFS/Drugs.com: Monograph
- MedlinePlus: a682482
- License data: US FDA: Tolazamide
- Pregnancy category: AU: C
- Routes of administration: Oral
- ATC code: A10BB05 (WHO)

Legal status
- Legal status: US: ℞-only

Pharmacokinetic data
- Bioavailability: ?
- Metabolism: metabolized in the liver to active metabolites
- Elimination half-life: 7 hours
- Excretion: Renal (85%) and fecal (7%)

Identifiers
- IUPAC name: N-[(azepan-1-ylamino)carbonyl]-4-methylbenzenesulfonamide
- CAS Number: 1156-19-0
- PubChem CID: 5503
- IUPHAR/BPS: 6847
- DrugBank: DB00839
- ChemSpider: 5302
- UNII: 9LT1BRO48Q
- KEGG: D00379
- ChEBI: CHEBI:9613
- ChEMBL: ChEMBL817
- CompTox Dashboard (EPA): DTXSID3021358
- ECHA InfoCard: 100.013.262

Chemical and physical data
- Formula: C_{14}H_{21}N_{3}O_{3}S
- Molar mass: 311.40 g·mol^{−1}
- 3D model (JSmol): Interactive image
- SMILES: O=S(=O)(c1ccc(cc1)C)NC(=O)NN2CCCCCC2
- InChI: InChI=1S/C14H21N3O3S/c1-12-6-8-13(9-7-12)21(19,20)16-14(18)15-17-10-4-2-3-5-11-17/h6-9H,2-5,10-11H2,1H3,(H2,15,16,18); Key:OUDSBRTVNLOZBN-UHFFFAOYSA-N

Tolazamide is an oral blood glucose lowering drug used for people with Type 2 diabetes. It is part of the sulfonylurea family (ATC A10BB).

== Synthesis ==
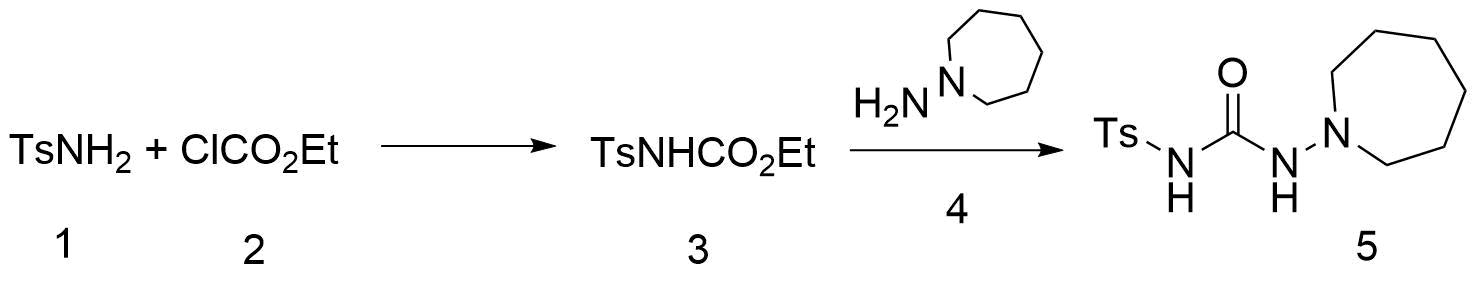

The reaction between p-toluenesulfonamide (1) and ethyl chloroformate (2) in the presence of base gives tosylurethane [5577-13-9] (3). Heating that intermediate with azepane (4) leads to the displacement of the ethoxy group and the formation of tolazemide (5).

Azepane proper would lead to [13078-23-4].
