= Acetolactate synthase =

Class of enzymes

acetolactate synthase
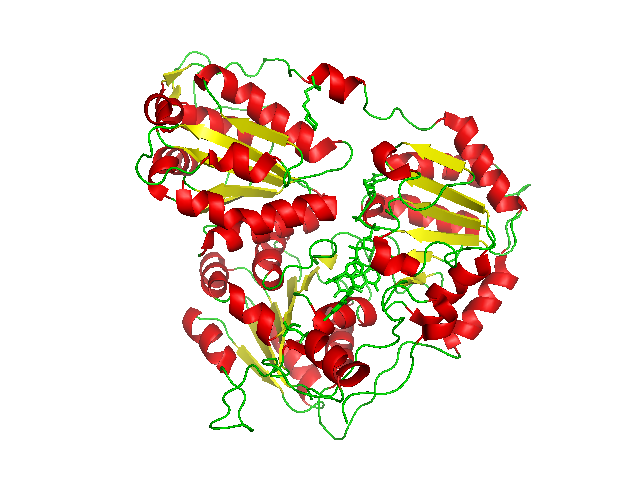
- Crystal structure of Arabidopsis thaliana acetohydroxyacid synthase complexed with a sulfonylurea herbicide, metsulfuron-methyl.

Identifiers
- EC no.: 2.2.1.6
- CAS no.: 9027-45-6
- Alt. names: pyruvate:pyruvate acetaldehydetransferase (decarboxylating)

Databases
- IntEnz: IntEnz view
- BRENDA: BRENDA entry
- ExPASy: NiceZyme view
- KEGG: KEGG entry
- MetaCyc: metabolic pathway
- PRIAM: profile
- PDB structures: RCSB PDB PDBe PDBsum
- Gene Ontology: AmiGO / QuickGO
Search
- PMC: articles
- PubMed: articles
- NCBI: proteins

The acetolactate synthase (ALS) enzyme (also known as acetohydroxy acid or acetohydroxyacid synthase, abbr. AHAS) is a protein found in plants and micro-organisms. ALS catalyzes the first step in the synthesis of the branched-chain amino acids (valine, leucine, and isoleucine).

== Structure ==
The catalytic peptide of ALS in Arabidopsis thaliana (mouse-eared cress) is a chloroplastic protein consisting of 670 residues, the last 615 of which form the active form. Three main domains are found, with two thiamine pyrophosphate sandwiching a DHS-like NAD/FAD-binding domain. In SCOP assignment, these subunits are named d1yhya1, d1yhya2, and d1yhya3 from the N-terminal to the C-terminal.

The structure of acetolactate synthase that was used for the picture on this page was determined using X-ray diffraction at 2.70 angstroms.

There are five specific ligands that interact with this protein. The five are listed below.

Ligand Identifier	Name	Formula
P22	Ethyl dihydrogen diphosphate	C_{2}H_{8}O_{7}P_{2}
NHE	CHES, 2-(Cyclohexylamino)ethane-1-sulfonic acid	C_{8}H_{17}NO_{3}S
Mg	Magnesium Ion	Mg
FAD	Flavin adenine dinucleotide	C_{27}H_{33}N_{9}O_{15}P_{2}
1SM	Methyl 2-[({[(4,6-dimethylpyrimidin-2-yl)amino]carbonyl}amino)sulfonyl]benzoate	C_{15}H_{16}N_{4}O_{5} S

The FAD bound is not catalytic.

== Function ==
Acetolactate synthase is catalytic enzyme involved in the biosynthesis of various amino acids. This enzyme has the Enzyme Commission Code is 2.2.1.6, which means that the enzyme is a transketolase or a transaldolase, which is classified under the transferases that transfer aldehyde or ketone residues. In this case, acetolactate synthase is a transketolase, which moves back and forth, having both catabolic and anabolic forms. These act on a ketone (pyruvate) and can go back and forth in the metabolic chain. These are found in humans, animals, plants, and bacteria. In plants, they are located in the chloroplasts in order to help with the metabolic processes. In baker's yeast, they are located in the mitochondria. In several experiments, it has been shown that mutated strains of Escherichia coli K-12 without the enzyme were not able to grow in the presence of only acetate or oleate as the only carbon sources.

A catabolic version that does not bind FAD (InterPro: IPR012782) is found in some bacteria.

== Catalytic activity ==
Acetolactate synthase, also known as acetohydroxy acid synthase, is an enzyme specifically involved in the conversion of pyruvate to acetolactate:

2 CH_{3}COCO^{−}_{2} → ^{−}O_{2}CC(OH)(CH_{3})COCH_{3} + CO_{2}

The reaction uses thiamine pyrophosphate in order to link the two pyruvate molecules. The resulting product of this reaction, acetolactate, eventually becomes valine or leucine. A similar reaction of pyruvate with 2-oxobutanoate yields 2-aceto-2-hydroxy-butyrate, which is a precursor of isoleucine. All three of these amino acids are essential amino acids and cannot be synthesized by humans. This also leads to the systemic name pyruvate:pyruvate acetaldehydetransferase (decarboxylating).

Four specific residues are responsible for catalytic activity in this enzyme. They are listed here with cofactors required written after.

Residue	Position	Cofactors
Valine	485	HE3
Methionine	513	HE3
Histidine	643	-
Glycine	511	TPP

The primary sequence of this protein in Arabidopsis is listed below. Residues involved in catalytic activity are bolded. Mutagenesis of Asp428, which is crucial carboxylate ligand to Mg(2+) in the "ThDP motif", leads to a decrease in the affinity of AHAS II for Mg(2+). While mutant D428N shows ThDP affinity close to that of the wild-type on saturation with Mg(2+), D428E has a decreased affinity for ThDP. These mutations also lead to dependence of the enzyme on K(+).

Primary sequence. Catalytic residues are bold

>sp|P1759|86-667
TFISRFAPDQPRKGADILVEALERQGVETVFAYPGGASMEIHQALTRSSSIRNVLPRHEQGGVFAAEGYARSSGKPGICIATSGPGATNLVSGLADALLD
SVPLVAITGQVPRRMIGTDAFQETPIVEVTRSITKHNYLVMDVEDIPRIIEEAFFLATSGRPGPVLVDVPKDIQQQLAIPNWEQAMRLPGYMSRMPKPPE
DSHLEQIVRLISESKKPVLYVGGGCLNSSDELGRFVELTGIPVASTLMGLGSYPXDDELSLHMLGMHGTVYANYAVEHSDLLLAFGVRFDDRVTGKLEAF
ASRAKIVHIDIDSAEIGKNKTPHVSVCGDVKLALQGMNKVLENRAEELKLDFGVWRNELNVQKQKFPLSFKTFGEAIPPQYAIKVLDELTDGKAIISTGV
GQHQMWAAQFYNYKKPRQWLSSGGLGAMGFGLPAAIGASVANPDAIVVDIDGDGSFIMNVQELATIRVENLPVKVLLLNNQHLGMVMQWEDRFYKANRAH
TFLGDPAQEDEIFPNMLLFAAACGIPAARVTKKADLREAIQTMLDTPGPYLLDVICPHQEHVLPMIPSGGTFNDVITEGDGR

Because of inhibition and several factors, it is a slow procedure.

== Regulation ==
In Arabidopsis, two chains of catalytic ALS (InterPro: IPR012846) is complexed with two regulatory small subunits (InterPro: IPR004789), AHASS2 and AHASS1. Such an arrangement is widespread in both bacterial and eukaryotic ALS. The hetromeric structure was demonstrated in E. coli in 1984 and in eukaryotes (S. cerevisiae and Porphyra purpurea) in 1997. Most of the regulatory proteins have an ACT domain (InterPro: IPR002912) and some of them have a NiKR-like C-terminal (InterPro: IPR027271)

In bacteria (E. coli)), Acetolactate synthase consists of three pairs of isoforms. Each pair includes a large subunit, which is thought to be responsible for catalysis, and a small subunit for feedback inhibition. Each subunit pair, or ALS I, II, and III respectively, is located on its own operon, ilvBN, ilvGM, and ilvIH (where ilvN regulated ilvB, and vice versa). Together, these operons code for several enzymes involved in branched-chain amino acid biosynthesis. Regulation is different for each operon.

The ilvGMEDA operon encodes the ilvGM (ALS II) pair as well as a branched-chain-amino-acid transaminase (ilvE), dihydroxy-acid dehydratase (ilvD), and threonine ammonia-lyase (ilvA). It is regulated by feedback inhibition in the form of transcriptional attenuation. That is, transcription is reduced in the presence of the pathway's end-products, the branched-chain amino acids.

The ilvBNC operon encodes the ilvBN (ALS I) pair and a ketol-acid reductoisomerase (ilvC). It is similarly regulated, but is specific to isoleucine and leucine; valine does not affect it directly.

Both the ilvGMEDA and ilvBNC operons are derepressed during shortages of the branched-chain amino acids by the same mechanism that represses them. Both of these operons as well as the third, ilvIH, are regulated by leucine-responsive protein (Lrp).

== Inhibitors ==
Inhibitors of ALS are used as herbicides that slowly starve affected plants of these amino acids, which eventually leads to inhibition of DNA synthesis. They affect grasses and dicots alike. They are not a chemistry class but rather a mechanism of action class with diverse chemistries. The ALS inhibitor family includes sulfonylureas (SUs), imidazolinones, triazolopyrimidines (see Category:Triazolopyrimidines), pyrimidinyl oxybenzoates, and sulfonylamino carbonyl triazolinones. As of March 2022, the ALS inhibitors suffer the worst (known) resistance problem of all herbicide classes, having 169 known resistant target species. The structures of ALS herbicides are radically different from the normal substrate and so none of them bind at the catalytic site but instead at a site specific to herbicidal action. Therefore resistance mutations are expected to have widely varying effects on normal ALS catalysis activity, positive, negative, and neutral. Unsurprisingly that is exactly what experiments have shown, including Yu et al., 2007 finding resistance in Hordeum murinum due to a proline→serine substitution at amino acid 197 to increase ALS activity by 2x-3x.

== Interactions ==
In the study of Escherichia coli, the FAD-binding domain of ilvB has been shown to interact with ilvN and activate the AHAS I enzyme.
