= Sulfonylurea =

Class of organic compounds used in medicine and agriculture

General structural formula of a sulfonylurea. The functional group consists of a sulfonyl group and a N-substituted ureylene group

Sulfonylureas or sulphonylureas are a class of organic compounds used in medicine and agriculture. The functional group consists of a sulfonyl group (-S(=O)_{2}) with its sulphur atom bonded to a nitrogen atom of a ureylene group (N,N-dehydrourea, a dehydrogenated derivative of urea). The side chains R_{1} and R_{2} distinguish various sulfonylureas. In humans, sulfonylureas are medically used in the management of type 2 diabetes by stimulating insulin secretion. Sulfonylureas are the most widely used herbicide.

== Agricultural uses ==
Many sulfonylureas are used as herbicides, because they can interfere with plant biosynthesis of certain amino acids.

As herbicides, sulfonylureas function by interfering with biosynthesis of the amino acids valine, isoleucine, and leucine, specifically via acetolactate synthase inhibition. Compounds in this class include amidosulfuron, chlorsulfuron, flazasulfuron, halosulfuron, imazosulfuron, metsulfuron-methyl, primisulfuron-methyl, sulfometuron-methyl, and tribenuron-methyl, and others as well.

These are broad-spectrum herbicides that kill plants weeds or pests by inhibiting the enzyme acetolactate synthase. In the 1960s, more than 1 kg/ha (0.89 lb/acre) crop protection chemical was typically applied, while sulfonylureates allow as little as 1% as much material to achieve the same effect.

== Medical uses ==
=== Treatment of type 2 diabetes ===
They are widely used as antidiabetic drugs in the management of diabetes mellitus type 2. They act by increasing secretion of insulin from the beta cells in the pancreas.

Sulfonylureas are ineffective where there is absolute deficiency of insulin production such as in type 1 diabetes or post-pancreatectomy.

Sulfonylureas can be used to treat some types of neonatal diabetes. Historically, people with hyperglycemia and low blood insulin levels were diagnosed with type 1 diabetes by default, but it has been found that patients who receive this diagnosis before 6 months of age are often candidates for receiving sulfonylureas rather than insulin throughout life.

A 2011 Cochrane systematic review evaluated the effects on treatment of Latent Autoimmune Diabetes in Adults (LADA) and found that Sulfonylureas did not improve metabolic control of glucose at 3 and 12 months, even worsening HbA1c levels in some cases, when compared to insulin. The same review did not find improvement of fasting C-peptide following treatment with sulfonylurea. Still, it is important to highlight that the studies available to be included in this review presented considerable flaws in quality and design.

While prior sulfonylureas were associated with worse outcomes, newer agents do not appear to increase the risk of death, heart attacks, or strokes. This is further reinforced by a 2020 Cochrane systematic review which did not find enough evidence of reduction of all-cause mortality, serious adverse events, cardiovascular mortality, non-fatal myocardial infarction, non-fatal stroke or end-stage renal disease when comparing metformin monotherapy to sulfonylureas. This same review also did not find improvement in health-related quality of life.

In individuals with impaired-glucose tolerance, a 2019 systematic review only found one suitable trial comparing the effects of Sulphonylurea with metformin in reduction or delay of risk of developing type 2 diabetes, however this trial did not report patient-relevant outcomes. Another systematic review completed in the same year suggested that there is limited evidence if the combined use of Metformin with Sulphonylurea compared to the combination of Metformin plus another glucose-lowering intervention, provides benefit or harm in mortality, severe adverse events, macrovascular and microvascular complications. Combined Metformin and Sulphonylurea therapy did appear to lead to higher risk of Hypoglycemia.

=== Interleukin-1 β inhibitors ===
Sulfonylureas are also used experimentally to inhibit release of interleukin 1 beta from the NALP3 (or NLRP3) inflammasome.

=== Side effects ===
Sulfonylureas – as opposed to metformin, the thiazolidinediones, pramlintide and other newer treatments – may induce hypoglycemia as a result of excesses in insulin production and release. Hypoglycemia appears to happen more often with sulfonylureas than compared to other treatments. This typically occurs if the dose is too high, and the patient is fasting. Some people attempt to change eating habits to prevent this, however it can be counterproductive.

Like insulin, sulfonylureas can induce weight gain, mainly as a result of their effect to increase insulin levels and thus use of glucose and other metabolic fuels. Other side-effects are: gastrointestinal upset, headache and hypersensitivity reactions. Skin reactions and dark-colored urine, which indicates a liver injury, are other side effects that have been observed.

The safety of sulfonylurea therapy in pregnancy is unestablished. Prolonged hypoglycemia (4 to 10 days) has been reported in children borne to mothers taking sulfonylureas at the time of delivery. Impairment of liver or kidney function increase the risk of hypoglycemia, and are contraindications. Since other antidiabetic drugs cannot be used either under these circumstances, insulin therapy is typically recommended during pregnancy and in liver and kidney failure, although some of the newer agents offer potentially better options.

A 2011 Cochrane review found evidence that treatment of LADA using sulfonylureas lead to earlier insulin dependence in approximately 30% of cases.

A 2014 Cochrane review found tentative evidence that people treated with sulfonylureas have fewer non-fatal cardiovascular events than those treated with metformin (RR 0.7) but a higher risk of severe hypoglycemia (RR 5.6). There was not enough data available to determine the risk of mortality or of cardiovascular mortality. The FDA requires sulfonylureas to carry a label warning regarding increased risk of cardiovascular death.

A 2020 Cochrane systematic review comparing metformin monotherapy to sulfonylureas did not find enough evidence of reduction of all-cause mortality, serious adverse events, cardiovascular mortality, non-fatal myocardial infarction, non-fatal stroke or end-stage renal disease.

Second-generation sulfonylureas have increased potency by weight, compared to first-generation sulfonylureas. Similarly, ACCORD (Action to Control Cardiovascular Risk in Diabetes) and the VADT (Veterans Affairs Diabetes Trial) studies showed no reduction in heart attack or death in patients assigned to tight glucose control with various drugs.

=== Interactions ===
Drugs that potentiate or prolong the effects of sulfonylureas and therefore increase the risk of hypoglycemia include acetylsalicylic acid and derivatives, allopurinol, sulfonamides, and fibrates. Drugs that worsen glucose tolerance, contravening the effects of antidiabetics, include corticosteroids, isoniazid, oral contraceptives and other estrogens, sympathomimetics, and thyroid hormones. Sulfonylureas tend to interact with a wide variety of other drugs, but these interactions, as well as their clinical significance, vary from substance to substance.

== Structure ==
Sulfonylureas contain a central S-arylsulfonylurea structure with a p-substituent on the phenyl ring (R^{1}) and various groups terminating the urea N′ end group (R^{2}). Chemically, this functionality can be easily installed by reacting aryl sulfonamides (R^{1}—C_{6}H_{4}—SO_{2}NH_{2}) with isocyanates (R^{2}—NCO).

Chlorpropamide (1st generation)

Tolazamide (1st generation)

Gliclazide (2nd generation)

Glimepiride (2nd generation)

=== Classification ===
Sulfonylureas are divided into 3 classes on basis of therapeutic efficiency of their antidiabetic action:

- First-generation drugs:

They include acetohexamide, carbutamide, chlorpropamide, glycyclamide (tolcyclamide), metahexamide, tolazamide and tolbutamide.

- Second-generation drugs:

They include glibenclamide (glyburide), glibornuride, gliclazide, glipizide, gliquidone, glisoxepide and glyclopyramide.

- Third-generation drugs:

They include glimepiride, although it is sometimes considered a second-generation drug.

=== Mechanism of action ===
Diagram of glucose reduction and insulin release in the pancreas

Sulfonylureas bind to and close ATP-sensitive K^{+} (K_{ATP}) channels on the cell membrane of pancreatic beta cells, which depolarizes the cell by preventing potassium from exiting. This depolarization opens voltage-gated Ca^{2+} channels. The rise in intracellular calcium leads to increased fusion of insulin granules with the cell membrane, and therefore increased secretion of mature insulin.

There is some evidence that sulfonylureas also sensitize β-cells to glucose, that they limit glucose production in the liver, that they decrease lipolysis (breakdown and release of fatty acids by adipose tissue) and decrease clearance of insulin by the liver.

The K_{ATP} channel is an octameric complex of the inward-rectifier potassium ion channel K_{ir}6.x and sulfonylurea receptor SUR which associate with a stoichiometry of 4:4.

Furthermore, it has been shown that sulfonylureas interact with the nucleotide exchange factor Epac2. Mice lacking this factor exhibited a decreased glucose-lowering effect upon sulfonylurea treatment.

=== History ===
Sulfonylureas were discovered in 1942, by the chemist Marcel Janbon and co-workers in France, who were studying sulfonamide antibiotics and discovered that the compound sulfonylurea induced hypoglycemia in animals.

Research and development (translational research and commercial application development) for sulfonylureas as pharmaceuticals (as diagnostic and therapeutic agents in prediabetes and diabetes) happened in the 1950s and 1960s, as explored at Tolbutamide § History.

Research and development (translational research and commercial application development) for sulfonylureas as herbicides happened in the 1970s and 1980s, as explored for example in a volume of the Sloan Technology Series focusing on the sociotechnological aspects of agriculture (Canine 1995); the DuPont Experimental Station led this development.
