= List of causes of hypoglycemia =

Causes of low blood sugar in humans

The following is a list of causes of hypoglycemia.

== Newborns ==
Hypoglycemia is a common problem with an increasing incidence in critically ill or extremely low birthweight infants. Its potential association with brain damage and neurodevelopment delay make it an important topic. If not due to maternal hyperglycemia, in most cases it is multifactorial, transient and easily supported. In a minority of cases, hypoglycemia turns out to be due to significant hyperinsulinism, hypopituitarism or an inborn error of metabolism and presents more of a management challenge.

- Transient neonatal hypoglycemia
  - Prematurity, intrauterine growth retardation, perinatal asphyxia
  - Maternal hyperglycemia due to diabetes or iatrogenic glucose administration
  - Sepsis
  - Prolonged fasting (e.g., due to inadequate breast milk or condition interfering with feeding)
- Congenital hypopituitarism
- Congenital hyperinsulinism, several types, both transient and persistent
- Inborn errors of carbohydrate metabolism such as glycogen storage disease

== Young children ==
Single episodes of hypoglycemia may occur due to gastroenteritis or fasting, but recurrent episodes nearly always indicate either an inborn error of metabolism, congenital hypopituitarism, or congenital hyperinsulinism. A list of common causes:

- Prolonged fasting
  - Diarrheal illness in young children, especially rotavirus gastroenteritis
- Idiopathic ketotic hypoglycemia
- Isolated growth hormone deficiency, hypopituitarism
- Insulin excess
  - Hyperinsulinism due to several congenital disorders of insulin secretion
  - Insulin injected for type 1 diabetes
  - Hyperinsulinism-hyperammonemia syndrome (HIHA) due to glutamate dehydrogenase 1 gene. Can cause intellectual disability and epilepsy in severe cases.
- Gastric dumping syndrome (after gastrointestinal surgery)
- Other congenital metabolic diseases; some of the common include
  - Maple syrup urine disease and other organic acidurias
  - Type 1 glycogen storage disease
  - Type III glycogen storage disease. Can cause less severe hypoglycemia than type I
  - Phosphoenolpyruvate carboxykinase deficiency, causes metabolic acidosis and severe hypoglycemia.
  - Disorders of fatty acid oxidation
  - Medium chain acylCoA dehydrogenase deficiency (MCAD)
  - Familial Leucine sensitive hypoglycemia
- Accidental ingestions including pharmacy misfills
  - Sulfonylureas, propranolol and others
  - Ethanol (mouthwash, alcoholic beverages)

== Young adults ==
By far, the most common cause of severe hypoglycemia in this age range is insulin injected for type 1 diabetes. Circumstances should provide clues fairly quickly for the new diseases causing severe hypoglycemia. All of the congenital metabolic defects, congenital forms of hyperinsulinism, and congenital hypopituitarism are likely to have already been diagnosed or are unlikely to start causing new hypoglycemia at this age. Body mass is large enough to make starvation hypoglycemia and idiopathic ketotic hypoglycemia quite uncommon. Recurrent mild hypoglycemia may fit a reactive hypoglycemia pattern, but this is also the peak age for idiopathic postprandial syndrome, and recurrent "spells" in this age group can be traced to orthostatic hypotension or hyperventilation as often as demonstrable hypoglycemia.

- Insulin-induced hypoglycemia
  - Insulin injected for type 1 diabetes
  - Factitious insulin injection (Munchausen syndrome)
  - Insulin-secreting pancreatic tumor (Insulinoma)
  - Reactive hypoglycemia and idiopathic postprandial syndrome
- Addison's disease
- Sepsis

== Older adults ==
The incidence of hypoglycemia due to complex drug interactions, especially involving oral hypoglycemic agents and insulin for diabetes, rises with age. Though much rarer, the incidence of insulin-producing tumors also rises with advancing age. Most tumors causing hypoglycemia by mechanisms other than insulin excess occur in adults.

- Insulin-induced hypoglycemia
  - Insulin injected for diabetes
  - Factitious insulin injection (Munchausen syndrome)
  - Excessive effects of oral Anti-diabetic medication, beta-blockers, or drug interactions
  - Insulin-secreting neuroendocrine tumor (insulinoma) of the pancreas
  - Alcohol induced hypoglycemia often linked with ketoacidosis (depletion of NAD+ leads to a block of gluconeogenesis)
  - Alimentary (rapid jejunal emptying with exaggerated insulin response)
    - After gastrectomy dumping syndrome or bowel bypass surgery or resection
  - Reactive hypoglycemia and Idiopathic postprandial syndrome
- Tumor hypoglycemia, Doege-Potter syndrome
- Acquired adrenal insufficiency
- Acquired hypopituitarism
- Immunopathologic hypoglycemia

== Causes by organ system ==
Cardiovascular	No underlying causes
Chemical / poisoning	1,1-Dichloroethene, Ackee fruit, Jamaican vomiting sickness, Systemic monochloroacetate poisoning
Dermatologic	No underlying causes
Drug Side Effect	Acetohexamide, Amprenavir, Chloramphenicol, Chlorpromazine, Chlorpropamide, Cibenzoline, Clove, Ethanol, Ethionamide, Fluorodeoxyglucose, Gatifloxacin, Ginseng, Glibenclamide, Gliclazide, Glimepiride, Glipizide, Gliquidone, Glisolamide, Glisoxepide, Insulin, Insulin-like growth factor, Lanreotide, Levomepromazine, Mitiglinide, Nateglinide, Pazopanib, Pentamidine, Perazine, Pipothiazine, Pramlintide, Quinine, Repaglinide, Ritonavir, Saquinavir, Somatostatin, Sulfamethoxazole, Temafloxacin, Tolazamide, Tolbutamide, Trimethoprim
Ear Nose Throat	No underlying causes
Endocrine	Addison's disease, Adrenal insufficiency, Beginning stages of diabetes, Glucagon deficiency, Hypopituitarism, Hypothyroidism, Multiple endocrine neoplasia, Myxedema coma, Timme syndrome
Environmental	No underlying causes
Gastroenterologic	Acute fatty liver of pregnancy, Acute liver failure, Cirrhosis, Diabetic gastroparesis, Diarrhea, Dumping syndrome, Functioning pancreatic endocrine tumor, Gastric dumping syndrome, Hepatic congestion, Hepatic failure, Idiopathic postprandial syndrome, Insulinoma, Liver cancer, Malabsorption, Maldigestion, Reactive hypoglycemia, Severe hepatitis
Genetic	2-methylbutyryl-coenzyme A dehydrogenase deficiency, 3-alpha-hydroxyacyl-CoA dehydrogenase deficiency, 3-Methylcrotonyl-CoA carboxylase deficiency, ACAD9 deficiency, Alpers' syndrome, Carbohydrate-deficient glycoprotein syndrome type 1b, Carnitine palmitoyltransferase I deficiency, Carnitine-acylcarnitine translocase deficiency, Cleft lip palate pituitary deficiency, Dicarboxylicaminoaciduria, Dihydrolipoamide dehydrogenase deficiency, Donohue syndrome, Dopamine beta-hydroxylase deficiency, Familial glucocorticoid deficiency, Familial hyperinsulinemic hypoglycemia type 3, Familial hyperinsulinemic hypoglycemia type 5, Familial hyperinsulinemic hypoglycemia type 7, Fructose-1,6-diphosphatase deficiency, Fructose-1-phosphate aldolase deficiency, Galactose-1-phosphate uridyltransferase deficiency, Glucose 6 phosphate dehydrogenase deficiency, Glutaric acidemia type 2, Glycogenosis type 1a, Glycogenosis type 1b, Glycogenosis type 3, Glycogenosis type 6, Glycogenosis type 9a, Glycogenosis type 9b, Glycogenosis type 9c, Glycogenosis type V, Growth hormone deficiency (congenital), Hereditary ACTH resistance, HMG-CoA lyase deficiency, Hydroxymethylglutaryl-CoA lyase deficiency, Hyperinsulinism-hyperammonemia syndrome, Laron dwarfism, Leucine-induced hypoglycaemia, Liver glycogen synthase deficiency, Long-chain hydroxyacyl-CoA dehydrogenase deficiency, Malonyl-CoA decarboxylase deficiency, Maple syrup urine disease, Medium chain acyl-CoA dehydrogenase deficiency, Methylmalonic acidemia, Mitochondrial DNA depletion syndrome, hepatocerebral form, Mitochondrial trifunctional protein deficiency, Navajo neurohepatopathy, Nephroblastomatosis-fetal ascites-macrosomia-wilms tumor, Nesidioblastosis, Plasma membrane carnitine transporter deficiency, Propionyl-CoA carboxylase deficiency PCCA type, Short-chain acyl-CoA dehydrogenase deficiency, Short stature-pituitary and cerebellar defects-small sella turcica, Triple A syndrome, Tyrosinaemia type 1, Very-long-chain acyl-CoA dehydrogenase deficiency, Wiedemann-Beckwith syndrome, X-linked congenital adrenal hypoplasia
Hematologic	Hemolytic disease of the newborn
Iatrogenic	Gastrojejunostomy, Postgastrectomy syndrome, Pyloroplasty, Reye syndrome
Infectious Disease	Acute meningitis, Malaria (malignant tertian), Sepsis, Visceral leishmaniasis
Musculoskeletal / Ortho	No underlying causes
Neurologic	Autonomic dystonia, Autonomic neuropathy, Elevated vagal tone
Nutritional / Metabolic	Coenzyme Q cytochrome c reductase deficiency, Deficiency in enzymes of fat oxidation, Fructose intolerance, Galactosemia, Glycogen debranching deficiency, Hypoketonemic hypoglycemia, Ketotic hypoglycemia of infancy, Mcquarrie type infantile idiopathic hypoglycemia, Organic acidemia, Phosphoenolpyruvate carboxykinase (PEPCK) deficiency, Urea cycle disorder, Glucagon deficiency, ACAD9 deficiency, Dicarboxylicaminoaciduria, Fructose-1,6-diphosphatase deficiency, Fructose-1-phosphate aldolase deficiency, Glucose 6 phosphate dehydrogenase deficiency, Glutaric acidemia type 2, Glycogenosis type 1a, Glycogenosis type 1b, Glycogenosis type 3, Glycogenosis type 6, Glycogenosis type 9a, Glycogenosis type 9b, Glycogenosis type 9c, Glycogenosis type V, HMG-CoA lyase deficiency, Hydroxymethylglutaryl-CoA lyase deficiency, Long-chain hydroxyacyl-CoA dehydrogenase deficiency, Malonyl-CoA decarboxylase deficiency, Maple syrup urine disease, Medium chain acyl-CoA dehydrogenase deficiency, Methylmalonic acidemia, Nesidioblastosis, Propionyl-CoA carboxylase deficiency PCCA type, Short-chain acyl-CoA dehydrogenase deficiency, Tyrosinaemia type 1, Very-long-chain acyl-CoA dehydrogenase deficiency
Obstetric/Gynecologic	Diabetic mother, Gestational diabetes, Intrauterine growth retardation, Pregnancy, Premature labour and/or delivery, Sheehan syndrome
Oncologic	Adrenal cancer, Doege-Potter syndrome, IGF producing tumors, Tumors, Functioning pancreatic endocrine tumor, Insulinoma, Liver cancer, Mesothelioma
Ophthalmologic	No underlying causes
Overdose / Toxicity	Acetohexamide, Amprenavir, Chloramphenicol, Chlorpromazine, Chlorpropamide, Cibenzoline, Clove, Ethanol, Ethionamide, Fluorodeoxyglucose, Gatifloxacin, Ginseng, Glibenclamide, Gliclazide, Glimepiride, Glipizide, Gliquidone, Glisolamide, Glisoxepide, Insulin, Lanreotide, Levomepromazine, Mitiglinide, Nateglinide, Pazopanib, Pentamidine, Perazine, Pipothiazine, Pramlintide, Quinine, Repaglinide, Ritonavir, Saquinavir, Somatostatin, Sulfamethoxazole, Temafloxacin, Tolazamide, Tolbutamide, Trimethoprim
Psychiatric	Anorexia nervosa, Bulimia nervosa, Munchausen syndrome
Pulmonary	Mesothelioma
Renal / Electrolyte	Benign glucosuria, Kidney Failure, Renal hypoglycemia, Uremia
Rheum / Immune / Allergy	Autoimmune adrenalitis, Hemolytic disease of the newborn, Immunopathologic hypoglycemia, Insulin receptor antibodies
Sexual	No underlying causes
Trauma	Burns
Urologic	No underlying causes
Dental	No underlying causes
Miscellaneous	Alcoholism, Binge drinking, Cachexia, Delayed separation blood sample, Drip arm sample, Fasting, Heavy exercise, Hypothermia, Idiopathic hypoglycemia, Septic shock, Starvation (acute)

== Alphabetical order ==
- 1,1-Dichloroethene
- 2-methylbutyryl-coenzyme A dehydrogenase deficiency
- 3-alpha-hydroxyacyl-CoA dehydrogenase deficiency
- 3-Methylcrotonyl-CoA carboxylase deficiency
- ACAD9 deficiency
- Acetohexamide
- Ackee fruit
- Acute fatty liver of pregnancy
- Acute liver failure
- Acute meningitis
- Addison's disease
- Adrenal cancer
- Adrenal cortex insufficiency
- Adrenal insufficiency
- Alcoholism
- Alpers' syndrome
- Amprenavir
- Anorexia nervosa
- Autoimmune adrenalitis
- Autonomic dystonia
- Autonomic neuropathy
- Beginning stages of diabetes
- Benign glucosuria
- Binge drinking
- Bulimia nervosa
- Burns
- Cachexia
- Carbohydrate-deficient glycoprotein syndrome type 1b
- Carnitine palmitoyltransferase I deficiency
- Carnitine-acylcarnitine translocase deficiency
- Chloramphenicol
- Chlorpromazine
- Chlorpropamide
- Cibenzoline
- Cirrhosis
- Cleft lip palate pituitary deficiency
- Clove
- Coenzyme Q cytochrome c reductase deficiency
- Combined malonic and methylmalonic aciduria (CMAMMA)
- Deficiency in enzymes of fat oxidation
- Delayed separation blood sample
- Diabetic gastroparesis
- Diabetic mother
- Diarrhea
- Dicarboxylicaminoaciduria
- Dihydrolipoamide dehydrogenase deficiency
- Doege-Potter syndrome
- Donohue syndrome
- Dopamine beta-hydroxylase deficiency
- Drip arm sample
- Dumping syndrome
- Elevated vagal tone
- Ethanol
- Ethionamide
- Familial glucocorticoid deficiency
- Familial hyperinsulinemic hypoglycemia type 3
- Familial hyperinsulinemic hypoglycemia type 5
- Familial hyperinsulinemic hypoglycemia type 7
- Fasting
- Fluorodeoxyglucose
- Fructose intolerance
- Fructose-1,6-diphosphatase deficiency
- Fructose-1-phosphate aldolase deficiency
- Functioning pancreatic endocrine tumor
- Galactose-1-phosphate uridyltransferase deficiency
- Galactosemia
- Gastric dumping syndrome
- Gastrojejunostomy
- Gatifloxacin
- Gestational diabetes
- Ginseng
- Glibenclamide
- Gliclazide
- Glimepiride
- Glipizide
- Gliquidone
- Glisolamide
- Glisoxepide
- Glucagon deficiency
- Glucose 6 phosphate dehydrogenase deficiency
- Glutaric acidemia type 2
- Glycogen debranching deficiency
- Glycogenosis type 1a
- Glycogenosis type 1b
- Glycogenosis type 3
- Glycogenosis type 6
- Glycogenosis type 9a
- Glycogenosis type 9b
- Glycogenosis type 9c
- Glycogenosis type V
- Growth hormone deficiency (congenital)
- Heavy exercise
- Hemolytic disease of the newborn
- Hepatic congestion
- Hepatic failure
- Hereditary ACTH resistance
- HMG-CoA lyase deficiency
- Hydroxymethylglutaryl-CoA lyase deficiency
- Hyperinsulinism-hyperammonemia syndrome
- Hypoketonemic hypoglycemia
- Hypopituitarism
- Hypothermia
- Hypothyroidism
- Idiopathic hypoglycemia
- Idiopathic postprandial syndrome
- IGF producing tumors
- Immunopathologic hypoglycemia
- Insulin
- Insulin-like growth factor
- Insulin receptor antibodies
- Insulinoma
- Intrauterine growth retardation
- Jamaican vomiting sickness
- Ketotic hypoglycemia of infancy
- Kidney Failure
- Lanreotide
- Laron dwarfism
- Leucine-induced hypoglycaemia
- Levomepromazine
- Liver cancer
- Liver glycogen synthase deficiency
- Long-chain hydroxyacyl-CoA dehydrogenase deficiency
- Lupus
- Malabsorption
- Malaria (malignant tertian)
- Maldigestion
- Malonyl-CoA decarboxylase deficiency
- Maple syrup urine disease
- Mcquarrie type infantile idiopathic hypoglycemia
- Medium chain acyl-CoA dehydrogenase deficiency
- Mesothelioma
- Methylmalonic acidemia
- Mitiglinide
- Mitochondrial DNA depletion syndrome, hepatocerebral form
- Mitochondrial trifunctional protein deficiency
- Multiple endocrine neoplasia
- Multiple Sclerosis
- Munchausen syndrome
- Myxedema coma
- Nateglinide
- Navajo neurohepatopathy
- Nephroblastomatosis-fetal ascites-macrosomia-wilms tumor
- Nesidioblastosis
- Organic acidemia
- Pazopanib
- Pentamidine
- Perazine
- Phosphoenolpyruvate carboxykinase (PEPCK) deficiency
- Pipothiazine
- Plasma membrane carnitine transporter deficiency
- Postgastrectomy syndrome
- Pramlintide
- Pregnancy
- Premature labour and/or delivery
- Propionyl-CoA carboxylase deficiency PCCA type
- Pyloroplasty
- Quinine
- Reactive hypoglycemia
- Renal hypoglycemia
- Repaglinide
- Reye syndrome
- Ritonavir
- Saquinavir
- Sepsis
- Septic shock
- Severe hepatitis
- Sheehan syndrome
- Short-chain acyl-CoA dehydrogenase deficiency
- Short stature-pituitary and cerebellar defects-small sella turcica
- Somatostatin
- Starvation (acute)
- Sulfamethoxazole
- Systemic monochloroacetate poisoning
- Temafloxacin
- Timme syndrome
- Tolazamide
- Tolbutamide
- Trimethoprim
- Triple A syndrome
- Tumors
- Tyrosinaemia type 1
- Urea cycle disorder
- Uremia
- Very-long-chain acyl-CoA dehydrogenase deficiency
- Visceral leishmaniasis
- Wiedemann-Beckwith syndrome
- X-linked congenital adrenal hypoplasia
