= List of sulfonamides =

This is a list of sulfonamides used in medicine.

== Antimicrobials ==
Short-acting

- Sulfacetamide
- Sulfadiazine
- Sulfadimidine
- Sulfafurazole (sulfisoxazole)
- Sulfisomidine (sulfaisodimidine)
- Sulfaguanidine

Intermediate-acting

- Sulfamethoxazole
- Sulfamoxole
- Sulfanitran

Long-acting

- Sulfadimethoxine
- Sulfamethoxypyridazine
- Sulfametoxydiazine

Ultra long-acting

- Sulfadoxine
- Sulfametopyrazine
- Terephtyl

== Sulfonylureas (anti-diabetic agents) ==
- Acetohexamide
- Carbutamide
- Chlorpropamide
- Glibenclamide (glyburide)
- Glibornuride
- Gliclazide
- Glyclopyramide
- Glimepiride
- Glipizide
- Gliquidone
- Glisoxepide
- Glicaramide
- Tolazamide
- Tolbutamide

== Diuretics ==
- Acetazolamide
- Bumetanide
- Chlorthalidone
- Chlorothiazide
- Clopamide
- Furosemide
- Hydrochlorothiazide
- Indapamide
- Mefruside
- Metolazone
- Xipamide
- Methazolamide
- Torasemide

== Anticonvulsants ==
- Ethoxzolamide
- Sultiame
- Zonisamide

== Dermatologicals ==
- Mafenide

== Antiretrovirals ==
- Amprenavir (HIV protease inhibitor)
- Darunavir (HIV protease inhibitor)
- Delavirdine (non-nucleoside reverse transcriptase inhibitor)
- Fosamprenavir (HIV protease inhibitor)
- Tipranavir (HIV protease inhibitor)

== Hepatitis C antivirals ==
- Asunaprevir (NS3/4A protease inhibitor)
- Beclabuvir (NS5B RNA polymerase inhibitor)
- Dasabuvir (NS5B RNA polymerase inhibitor)
- Grazoprevir (NS3/4A protease inhibitor)
- Paritaprevir (NS3/4A protease inhibitor)
- Simeprevir (NS3/4A protease inhibitor)

== Stimulants ==
- Azabon

== NSAIDs ==
- Apricoxib (COX-2 inhibitor)
- Celecoxib (COX-2 inhibitor)
- Parecoxib (COX-2 inhibitor)

== Cardiac and Vasoactive Medications ==
- Bosentan (endothelin receptor antagonist)
- Diazoxide (insulin release inhibitor and vasodilator)
- Dofetilide (class III antiarrhythmic)
- Dronedarone (class III antiarrhythmic)
- Ibutilide (class III antiarrhythmic)
- Sotalol (β blocker)
- Tamsulosin (α blocker)
- Udenafil (PDE5 inhibitor)

== Triptans ==
- Almotriptan (antimigraine)
- Sumatriptan (antimigraine)
- Naratriptan (antimigraine)

== Others ==
- Brinzolamide (carbonic anhydrase inhibitor for glaucoma)
- Dorzolamide (anti-glaucoma carbonic anhydrase inhibitor)
- Famotidine (histamine H_{2} receptor antagonist)
- Probenecid (uricosuric)
- Sulfasalazine (anti-inflammatory agent and a DMARD)
- Vemurafenib (anticancer B-Raf inhibitor)
