= Hyperinsulinism =

Excess insulin in the blood

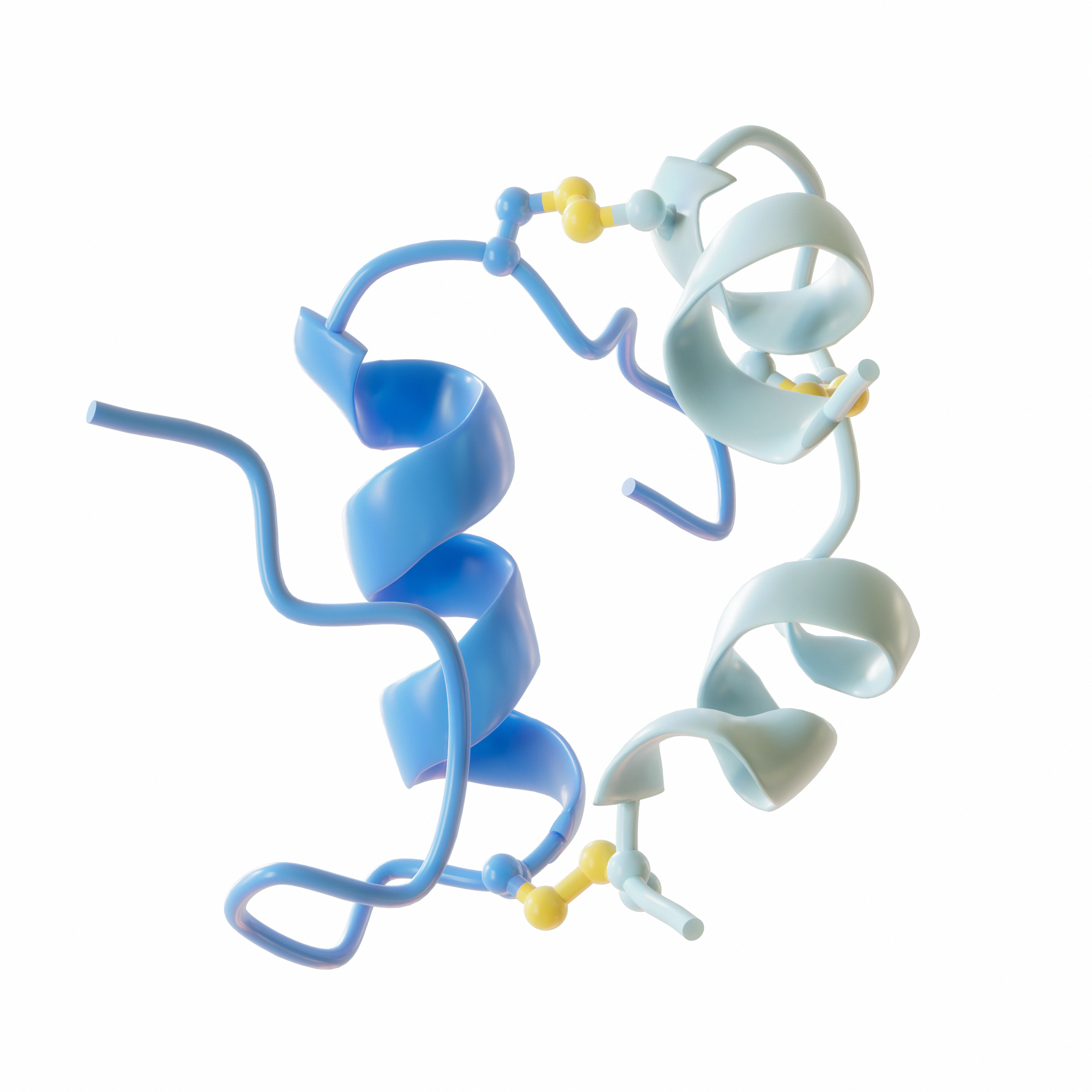
- Insulin
- Specialty: Endocrinology

Hyperinsulinism refers to an above normal level of insulin in the blood of a person or animal. Normal insulin secretion and blood levels are closely related to the level of glucose in the blood, so that a given level of insulin can be normal for one blood glucose level but low or high for another. Hyperinsulinism can be associated with several types of medical problems, which can be roughly divided into two broad and largely non-overlapping categories: those tending toward reduced sensitivity to insulin and high blood glucose levels (hyperglycemia), and those tending toward excessive insulin secretion and low glucose levels (hypoglycemia).

== Signs and symptoms ==
s/

Hyperinsulinism due to reduced insulin sensitivity is usually asymptomatic. In contrast, hyperinsulinemic hypoglycemia can produce any of the entire range of hypoglycemic symptoms, from shakiness and weakness, to seizures or coma.

== Diagnosis ==
=== Diminished sensitivity, associated with diabetes risk ===
Although many factors influence insulin secretion, the most important control is the amount of glucose moving from the blood into the beta cells of the pancreas. In healthy people, even small rises in blood glucose result in increased insulin secretion. As long as the pancreatic beta cells are able to sense the glucose level and produce insulin, the amount of insulin secreted is usually the amount required to maintain a fasting blood glucose between 70 and 100 mg/dL (3.9–5.6 mmol/L) and a non-fasting glucose level below 140 mg/dL (<7.8 mmol/L).

When liver cells and other cells that remove glucose from the blood become less sensitive (more resistant) to the insulin, the pancreas increases secretion and the level of insulin in the blood rises. This increased secretion can compensate for reduced sensitivity for many years, with maintenance of normal glucose levels. However, if insulin resistance worsens or insulin secretion ability declines, the glucose levels will begin to rise. Persistent elevation of glucose levels is termed diabetes mellitus.

Typical fasting insulin levels found in this type of hyperinsulinism are above 20 μU/mL. When resistance is severe, levels can exceed 100 μU/mL.

In addition to being a risk factor for type 2 diabetes, hyperinsulinism due to insulin resistance may increase blood pressure and contribute to hypertension by direct action on vascular endothelial cells (the cells lining blood vessels). Hyperinsulinism has also been implicated as a contributing factor in the excessive production of androgens in polyendocrine metabolic ovarian syndrome (PMOS).

The principal treatments of hyperinsulinism due to insulin resistance are measures that improve insulin sensitivity, such as weight loss, physical exercise, and drugs such as thiazolidinediones or metformin.

=== Inappropriate secretion, associated with hypoglycemia ===
Hyperinsulinism may also refer to forms of hypoglycemia caused by excessive insulin secretion. In normal children and adults, insulin secretion should be minimal when blood glucose levels fall below 70 mg/dL (3.9 mM). There are many forms of hyperinsulinemic hypoglycemia caused by various types of insulin excess. Some of those that occur in infants and young children are termed congenital hyperinsulinism. In adults, severe hyperinsulinemic hypoglycemia is often due to an insulinoma, an insulin-secreting tumor of the pancreas.

Insulin levels above 3 μU/mL are inappropriate when the glucose level is below 50 mg/dL (2.8 mM), and may indicate hyperinsulinism as the cause of the hypoglycemia. The treatment of this form of hyperinsulinism depends on the cause and the severity of the hyperinsulinism, and may include surgical removal of the source of insulin, or a drug such as diazoxide or octreotide that reduces insulin secretion.

That spontaneous hyperinsulinism might be a cause of symptomatic hypoglycemia was first proposed by Seale Harris, MD, 1924, in Journal of the American Medical Association. Dr. Seale Harris first diagnosed hyperinsulinism in 1924 and also is credited with the recognition of spontaneous hypoglycemia.

== See also ==
- Congenital hyperinsulinism
- Idiopathic hypoglycemia
- idiopathic postprandial syndrome
