= C18H18N2 =

The molecular formula C_{18}H_{18}N_{2} (molar mass: 262.35 g/mol) may refer to:

- Cibenzoline
- Fenharmane
