= Cyclohexylamine oxidase =

Class of enzymes

cyclohexylamine oxidase

Identifiers
- EC no.: 1.4.3.12
- CAS no.: 63116-97-2

Databases
- BRENDA: enzyme data
- ExPASy: NiceZyme view
- KEGG: enzyme entry
- MetaCyc: metabolic pathway
- Rhea: reactions
- PDB structures: RCSB PDB PDBe PDBsum
- Gene Ontology: AmiGO / QuickGO
Search
- PMC: articles
- PubMed: articles
- NCBI: proteins

In enzymology, cyclohexylamine oxidase (EC 1.4.3.12) is an enzyme that catalyzes the chemical reaction

cyclohexylamine
+ H_{2}O
O_{2}
H_{2}O_{2}
O_{2}
H_{2}O_{2}
cyclohexanone
+ NH_{3}

The three substrates of this enzyme are cyclohexylamine, water, and oxygen. Its products are cyclohexanone, hydrogen peroxide, and ammonia.

This enzyme belongs to the family of oxidoreductases, specifically those acting on the CH-NH_{2} group of donors with oxygen as acceptor. The systematic name of this enzyme class is cyclohexylamine:oxygen oxidoreductase (deaminating). This enzyme participates in caprolactam degradation. It employs one cofactor, FAD.
