= Chloral hydrate/magnesium sulfate/pentobarbital =

Combination veterinary anesthetic drug

Combination of
- Chloral hydrate: Sedative
- Magnesium sulfate: Neuromuscular blocker
- Pentobarbital: Barbiturate

Clinical data
- Trade names: Equithesin

Identifiers
- CAS Number: 39373-60-9

Chloral hydrate/magnesium sulfate/pentobarbital sodium, brand name Equithesin, is a combination anesthetic agent used as a general anesthetic in horses. It is administered intravenously to effect. For many years, it was the most commonly used injectable anesthetic in horses. Newer anesthetic agents such as injectable barbiturates, alpha-2 agonists, cyclohexylamines, and inhalants gradually replaced Equithesin. The drug has been off the market and unavailable for decades.

This combination anesthetic agent contains 42.5 mg chloral hydrate, 21.2 mg magnesium sulfate and 8.86 mg pentobarbital per milliliter.
