= Body scan =

Body scan may refer to:

- 3D body scanning, for measuring the body, used in Ergonomics
- Full body scanner in airport security
- Full-body CT scan, in medical imaging
- The mindfulness practice of body-scanning
