= Nateglinide =

Chemical compound

Clinical data
- Trade names: Starlix
- AHFS/Drugs.com: Monograph
- MedlinePlus: a699057
- License data: EU EMA: by INN; US FDA: Nateglinide
- Routes of administration: Oral
- ATC code: A10BX03 (WHO)

Legal status
- Legal status: UK: POM (Prescription only); US: ℞-only

Pharmacokinetic data
- Protein binding: 98%
- Elimination half-life: 1.5 hours

Identifiers
- IUPAC name: (2R)-2-({[trans-4-(1-methylethyl)cyclohexyl]carbonyl}amino)-3-phenylpropanoic acid
- CAS Number: 105816-04-4
- PubChem CID: 60026
- IUPHAR/BPS: 6833
- DrugBank: DB00731
- ChemSpider: 10482084
- UNII: 41X3PWK4O2
- KEGG: D01111
- ChEBI: CHEBI:31897
- ChEMBL: ChEMBL286559
- CompTox Dashboard (EPA): DTXSID9040687
- ECHA InfoCard: 100.170.086

Chemical and physical data
- Formula: C_{19}H_{27}NO_{3}
- Molar mass: 317.429 g·mol^{−1}
- 3D model (JSmol): Interactive image
- SMILES: O=C(N[C@H](Cc1ccccc1)C(O)=O)[C@H]2CC[C@@H](CC2)C(C)C
- InChI: InChI=1S/C19H27NO3/c1-13(2)15-8-10-16(11-9-15)18(21)20-17(19(22)23)12-14-6-4-3-5-7-14/h3-7,13,15-17H,8-12H2,1-2H3,(H,20,21)(H,22,23)/t15-,16-,17-/m1/s1; Key:OELFLUMRDSZNSF-BRWVUGGUSA-N

Nateglinide (INN, trade name Starlix) is a drug for the treatment of type 2 diabetes. Nateglinide was developed by Ajinomoto, a Japanese company and sold by the Swiss pharmaceutical company Novartis.

Nateglinide belongs to the meglitinide class of blood glucose-lowering drugs.

== Pharmacology ==
Nateglinide lowers blood glucose by stimulating the release of insulin from the pancreas. It achieves this by closing ATP-dependent potassium channels in the membrane of the β cells. This depolarizes the β cells and causes voltage-gated calcium channels to open. The resulting calcium influx induces fusion of insulin-containing vesicles with the cell membrane, and insulin secretion occurs.

== Contraindications ==
Nateglinide is contraindicated in patients who:

- have known hypersensitivity to the compound or any ingredient in the formulation.
- are affected with type 1 (namely insulin-dependent) diabetes mellitus.
- are in diabetic ketoacidosis.

== Comparisons with other drugs for type 2 diabetes ==
A study funded by Novo, the U.S. distributor for Repaglinide, compared their product with Nateglinide in "A randomized, parallel-group, open-label, multicenter 16-week clinical trial". They concluded that the two were similar, but "repaglinide monotherapy was significantly more effective than nateglinide monotherapy in reducing HbA1c and FPG values after 16 weeks of therapy."

== Dosage ==
Nateglinide is delivered in 60 mg & 120 mg tablet form.

== See also ==
- Repaglinide
