= Hyperinsulinism-hyperammonemia syndrome =

- Other names: HI/HA or HHS
- Causes: mutations of the GLUD1 gene

Hyperinsulinism-hyperammonemia syndrome (HI/HA) is an autosomal dominant disorder that results in the excess production of insulin and ammonia in mammals. HI/HA is caused by increased Glutamate dehydrogenase 1 (GDH) activity due to the presence of overactivating point mutations in GDH. These point mutations either directly or indirectly prevent guanosine triphosphate (GTP) binding and inhibition of GDH, which causes GDH to uncontrollably remain active.
