= Full-body CT scan =

Medical scan of patient's entire body

A full-body scan is a scan of the patient's entire body as part of the diagnosis or treatment of illnesses. If computed tomography (CAT) scan technology is used, it is known as a full-body CT scan invented by Robert S. Ledley, though many medical imaging technologies can perform full-body scans.

== Indications ==
Full-body CT scans allow a transparent view of the body. For polytrauma patients, aggressive use of full-body CT scanning improves early diagnosis of injury and improves survival rates, with widespread adoption of the technique seen worldwide. Full-body CT scans are not indicated in patients with minor or single system trauma, and should be avoided in such patients.

Many possible malignancies are discovered with a full-body scan, but these are almost always benign. These may not be related to any disease, and may be benign growths, scar tissue, or the remnants of previous infections. CT scanning for other reasons sometimes identifies these "incidentalomas".

However, the significance of radiation exposure as well as costs associated with these studies must be considered, especially in patients with low energy mechanisms of injury and absent physical examination findings consistent with major trauma.

A full-body scan has the potential to identify disease (e.g. cancer) in early stages, and early identification can improve the success of curative efforts. Controversy arises from the use of full-body scans in the screening of patients who have no signs or symptoms suggestive of a disease. As with any test that screens for disease, the risks of full-body CT scans need to be weighed against the benefit of identifying a treatable disease at an early stage.

An alternative to a full-body CT scan may be Magnetic resonance imaging (MRI) scans. MRI scans are generally more expensive than CT but do not expose the patient to ionizing radiation and are being evaluated for their potential value in screening.

== Risks and complications ==
Compared to most other diagnostic imaging procedures, CT scans result in relatively high radiation exposure. This exposure may be associated with a very small increase in cancer risk. The question is whether that risk is outweighed by the benefits of diagnosis and therapy

The procedure has a low rate of finding disease. It can cause confusion regarding incidentalomas. It is uncertain how to treat some of them, or if treatment is even necessary. The test also cannot detect colors, unlike for example a colonoscopy.

== Society and culture ==
At a cost of US$600 to $3000 as of 2002, full-body scans are expensive, and are rarely covered by insurance. However, in December 2007, the IRS stated that full-body scans qualify as deductible medical expenses, without a doctor's referral. This will likely lead employer-sponsored, flexible-spending plans to make the cost of the scans eligible for reimbursement.

== In popular culture ==
- In the Scrubs episode "My Fault", released April 22, 2004, Dr. Kelso decides to offer full-body scans at Sacred Heart Hospital, despite the objections of Dr. Cox, in his words: "I think showing perfectly healthy people every harmless imperfection in their body just to scare them into taking invasive and often pointless tests is an unholy sin." Kelso's offer is almost taken by Harvey Corman, who is an "admittedly frugal hypochondriac".
- In the episode "Role Model" of the TV show House, released April 12, 2005, the lead character Dr. Gregory House refers to full-body scans as "useless" because, in his words, "you could probably scan every one of us and find five different doo-dads that look like cancer". This issue was revisited in a later episode, "The Social Contract", where a full-body scan was successfully used to identify a tumor and diagnose Doege-Potter syndrome. Then in "Black Hole", House orders a full-body scan over the objections of his team, followed by a different scan on a pineal gland.

== See also ==
- Full body scanner
- Medical imaging
- Backscatter X-ray (for security scanning)
- Millimeter wave scanner (for security scanning)
