= Cyclohexylamine =

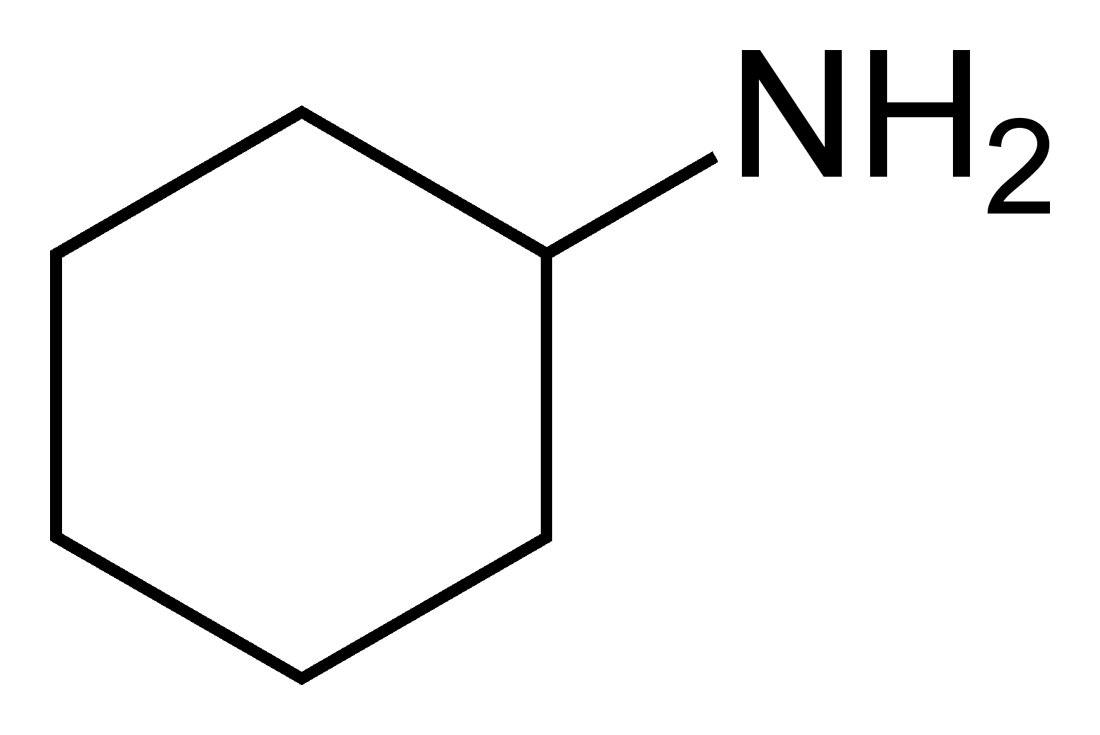

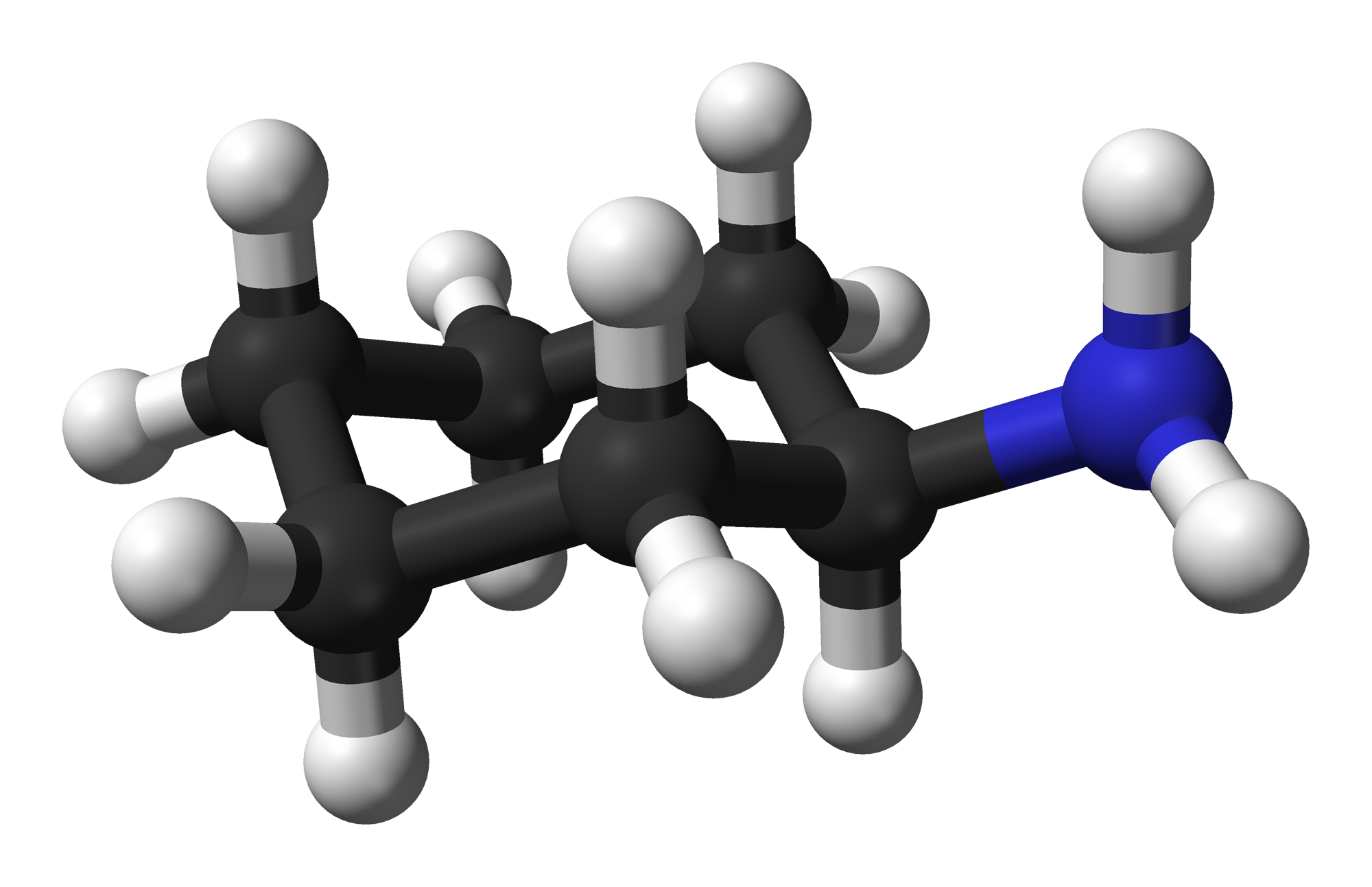

Names
- Preferred IUPAC name Cyclohexanamine
- Other names Aminocyclohexane; Aminohexahydrobenzene; Hexahydroaniline; Hexahydrobenzenamine

Identifiers
CAS Number	108-91-8
3D model (JSmol)	Interactive image
Abbreviations	CyNH_{2}
ChEBI	CHEBI:15773
ChEMBL	ChEMBL1794762
ChemSpider	7677
ECHA InfoCard	100.003.300
EC Number	203-629-0
IUPHAR/BPS	5507
KEGG	C00571
PubChem CID	7965
RTECS number	GX0700000
UNII	I6GH4W7AEG
CompTox Dashboard (EPA)	DTXSID1023996
- InChI: InChI=1S/C6H13N/c7-6-4-2-1-3-5-6/h6H,1-5,7H2 Key: PAFZNILMFXTMIY-UHFFFAOYSA-N; InChI=1/C6H13N/c7-6-4-2-1-3-5-6/h6H,1-5,7H2 Key: PAFZNILMFXTMIY-UHFFFAOYAP
- SMILES: NC1CCCCC1

Properties
Chemical formula	C_{6}H_{13}N
Molar mass	99.177 g·mol^{−1}
Appearance	Colorless liquid
Odor	strong, fishy, amine odor
Density	0.8647 g/cm^{3}
Melting point	−17.7 °C (0.1 °F; 255.5 K)
Boiling point	134.5 °C (274.1 °F; 407.6 K)
Solubility in water	Miscible
Solubility	very soluble in ethanol, oil miscible in ethers, acetone, esters, alcohol, ketones
Vapor pressure	11 mmHg (20°C)
Acidity (pK_{a})	10.64
Refractive index (n_{D})	1.4565

Hazards
- GHS labelling
Pictograms	(GHS02: Flammable) (GHS05: Corrosive) (GHS07: Exclamation mark) (GHS08: Health hazard)
Signal word	Danger
Hazard statements	H226, H302, H312, H314, H361
Precautionary statements	P201, P202, P210, P233, P240, P241, P242, P243, P260, P264, P270, P280, P281, P301+P312, P301+P330+P331, P302+P352, P303+P361+P353, P304+P340, P305+P351+P338, P308+P313, P310, P312, P321, P322, P330, P363, P370+P378, P403+P235, P405, P501
NFPA 704 (fire diamond)	3 3 0
Flash point	28.6 °C (83.5 °F; 301.8 K)
Autoignition temperature	293 °C (559 °F; 566 K)
Explosive limits	1.5–9.4%
- Lethal dose or concentration (LD, LC)
LD_{50} (median dose)	156 mg/kg (rat, oral)
- NIOSH (US health exposure limits)
PEL (Permissible)	none
REL (Recommended)	TWA 10 ppm (40 mg/m^{3})
IDLH (Immediate danger)	N.D.
- Except where otherwise noted, data are given for materials in their standard state (at 25 °C [77 °F], 100 kPa). verify (what is ?) Infobox references

Cyclohexylamine is an organic compound with the chemical formula C_{6}H_{13}N or C_{6}H_{11}NH_{2}, belonging to the aliphatic amine class. It is a colorless liquid, although, like many amines, samples are often yellowish due to contaminants. It has a fishy odor and is miscible with water. Like other amines, it is a weak base, compared to strong bases such as NaOH, but it is a stronger base than its aromatic analog, aniline.

It is a useful intermediate in the production of many other organic compounds (e.g. cyclamate)

== Preparation ==
Cyclohexylamine is produced by two routes, the main one being the complete hydrogenation of aniline using some cobalt- or nickel-based catalysts:

C_{6}H_{5}NH_{2} + 3 H_{2} → C_{6}H_{11}NH_{2}

It is also prepared by alkylation of ammonia using cyclohexanol.

== Applications ==
Cyclohexylamine is used as an intermediate in synthesis of other organic compounds. It is the precursor to sulfenamide-based reagents used as accelerators for vulcanization. The amine itself is an effective corrosion inhibitor. It has been used as a flushing aid in the printing ink industry.

=== Drugs List ===
It is a building block for pharmaceuticals (e.g., mucolytics, analgesics, and bronchodilators). Most of the drugs in the following list fall into the arena of sulfonamide hypoglycemics though:

- Acetohexamide
- Amesergide
- Bromhexine
- Brovanexine
- CGP-11112 (not actually made from CyNH_{2} but CyN containing).
- Cilostazol
- Clorexolone
- Cyclamate
- Enpromate
- Esaprazole
- Glibenclamide
- Glicaramide
- Gliquidone
- Glipizide
- Glisindamide
- Glisolamide
- Glycyclamide Patent (beispiel 5):
- Glyhexamide
- Hexazinone
- Hexylcaine
- Hydroxyhexamide
- Lomustine
- Metahexamide
- Timegadine
- Thiohexamide
- U-37883A HCl: [57568-80-6] Hair Growth Inhibition: Pharmacol:

U-37883A

== Toxicity ==
Cyclohexylamine has a low acute toxicity with LD_{50} (rat; p.o.) = 0.71 ml/kg Like other amines, it is corrosive.

Cyclohexylamine is listed as an extremely hazardous substance as defined by Section 302 of the U.S. Emergency Planning and Community Right-to-Know Act. The National Institute for Occupational Safety and Health has suggested workers not be exposed to a recommended exposure limit of over 10 ppm (40 mg/m^{3}) over an eight-hour workshift.
