= Meglitinide =

Chemical substance

- Drug class
- Meglitinide, the prototype of this drug class

Class identifiers
- Use: Type 2 diabetes
- ATC code: A10BX
- Mode of action: insulin secretagogue (release stimulator)
- Mechanism of action: close potassium channels of beta cells

Clinical data
- Drugs.com: Drug Classes

Legal status

Meglitinides or glinides are a class of drugs used to treat type 2 diabetes.

== Drugs ==
Repaglinide (trade name Prandin) gained US Food and Drug Administration approval in 1997.

Other drugs in this class include nateglinide (Starlix) and mitiglinide (Glufast).

== Side effects ==
Side effects include weight gain and hypoglycemia. While the potential for hypoglycemia is less than for those on sulfonylureas, it is still a serious potential side effect that can be life-threatening. Patients on this medication should know the signs and symptoms of hypoglycemia and appropriate management.

Repaglinide caused an increased incidence in male rats of benign adenomas (tumors) of the thyroid and liver. No such effect was seen with another drug of this class, nateglinide.

A 2020 Cochrane systematic review did not find enough evidence of reduction of all-cause mortality, serious adverse events, cardiovascular mortality, non-fatal myocardial infarction, non-fatal stroke or end-stage renal disease when comparing metformin monotherapy to meglitinide for the treatment of type 2 diabetes.

== Mechanism of action ==
They bind to an ATP-dependent K^{+} (K_{ATP}) channel on the cell membrane of pancreatic beta cells in a similar manner to sulfonylureas but have a weaker binding affinity and faster dissociation from the SUR1 binding site. This increases the concentration of intracellular potassium, which causes the electric potential toward the intracellular side of the membrane to become more positive. This depolarization opens voltage-gated Ca^{2+} channels. The rise in intracellular calcium leads to increased fusion of insulin granules in the cell membrane, and therefore increased secretion of (pro) insulin.
