= Terephtyl =

Antibiotic

Identifiers
- IUPAC name: N-(4,6-Dimethylpyrimidin-2-yl)-4-[(E)-({4-[(E)-({4- [(4,6-dimethylpyrimidin-2-yl)sulfamoyl]phenyl}imino)methyl]phenyl}methylidene)amino]benzene-1-sulfonamide
- CAS Number: 2468-28-2
- CompTox Dashboard (EPA): DTXSID001129300

Chemical and physical data
- Formula: C_{32}H_{30}N_{8}O_{4}S_{2}
- Molar mass: 654.76 g·mol^{−1}
- 3D model (JSmol): Interactive image
- SMILES: Cc1cc(C)nc(NS(=O)(=O)c2ccc(/N=C/c3ccc(/C=N/c4ccc(S(=O)(=O)Nc5nc(C)cc(C)n5)cc4)cc3)cc2)n1
- InChI: InChI=1S/C32H30N8O4S2/c1-21-17-22(2)36-31(35-21)39-45(41,42)29-13-9-27(10-14-29)33-19-25-5-7-26(8-6-25)20-34-28-11-15-30(16-12-28)46(43,44)40-32-37-23(3)18-24(4)38-32/h5-20H,1-4H3,(H,35,36,39)(H,37,38,40)/b33-19+,34-20+; Key:IQSUTADSCNTAFQ-ZXHXELASSA-N

Terephtyl is a long-acting synthetic sulfonamide antibiotic used for the treatment of infection caused by susceptible strains.

It is the Schiff base formed from sulfadimidine and terephthalaldehyde.
