= Idiopathic hypoglycemia =

Low blood sugar with an unknown cause

- Specialty: Endocrinology

Idiopathic hypoglycemia is a medical condition in which the glucose level in the blood (blood glucose) is abnormally low due to an undeterminable cause. This is considered an incomplete and unsatisfactory diagnosis by physicians and is rarely used by endocrinologists, as it implies an unfinished diagnostic evaluation. In general, the more severe the hypoglycemia and the more clearly it is proven, the less likely it is to remain "idiopathic". Idiopathic hypoglycemia can also be a synonym for reactive hypoglycemia or for hypoglycemia that is not diagnosed by a physician and does not fulfill the Whipple triad criteria. A more precise term for that condition is idiopathic postprandial syndrome.

== See also ==
- Hyperinsulinism
