= Pyloroplasty =

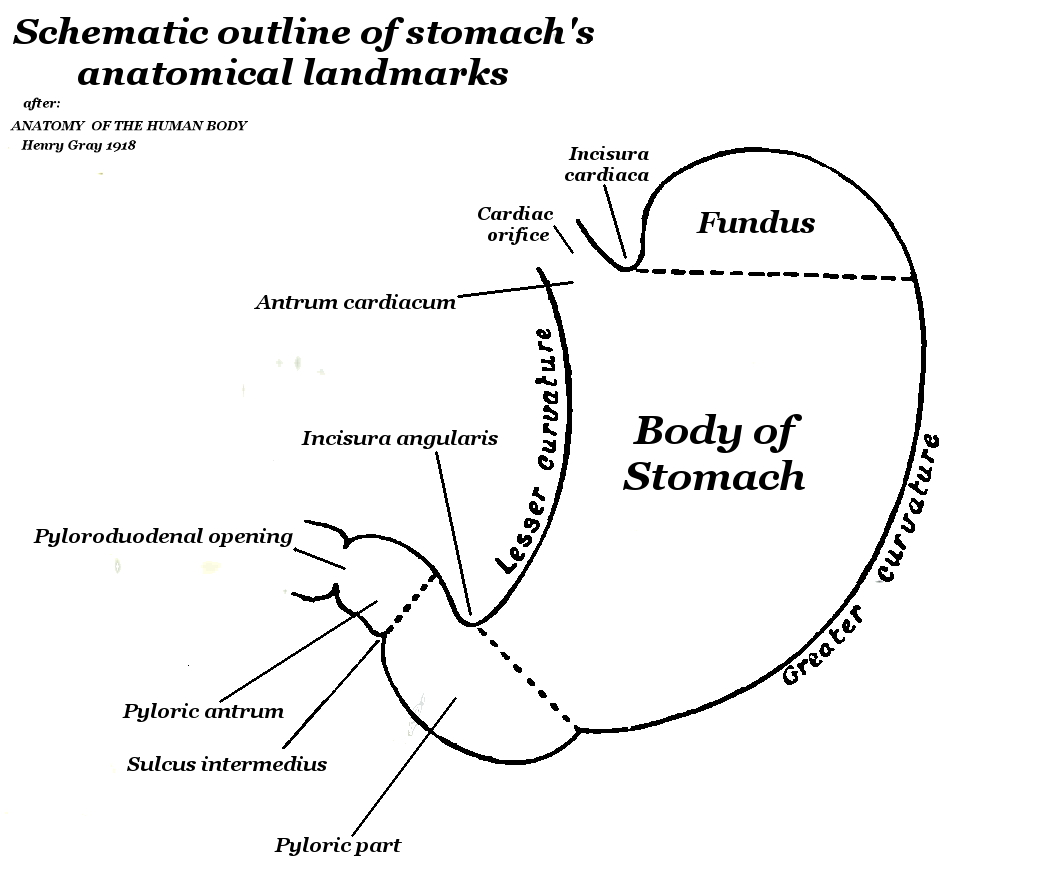
- Human Stomach schematic
- Specialty: Gastroenterology

Pyloroplasty is a surgery performed to widen the opening at the lower part of the stomach, also known as the pylorus. When the pylorus thickens, it becomes difficult for food to pass through. The surgery is performed to widen the band of muscle known as the pyloric sphincter, a ring of smooth, muscular fibers that surrounds the pylorus and helps to regulate digestion and prevent reflux. The widening of the pyloric sphincter enables the contents of the stomach to pass into the first part of the small intestine known as the duodenum.

== Applications ==
Pyloroplasty can be performed on a narrowed or thickened pylorus, but also on a normal pylorus. Pyloroplasty is used to treat those who have complications causing a blockage of the pylorus, commonly peptic ulcers. It also can be performed on patients at high risk for gastric or peptic ulcer disease (PUD). Pyloroplasty is almost never performed by itself; it is most commonly paired with another procedure like a vagotomy.

== Demographics ==
Nearly 4 million people in the US have PUD. It is estimated that 5 out of every 100,000 adults in US will develop a peptic ulcer. 80-90% of primary ulcers are believed to be caused by Helicobacter pylori bacteria, and infection by H. pylori occurs more often in black and Hispanic populations than white. PUD can occur in patients of all ages.

== Description and procedure ==
Pyloroplasty is performed while the patient is under general anesthesia and placed in the supine position. The surgery can be performed as an open surgery or by a laparoscope. If performed as an open surgery, the surgeon will make a large surgical incision on the abdomen to open the area, and incise through some of the pyloric sphincter to widen and relax it. A midline incision is most commonly used for this procedure. If performed by laparoscope, 3 to 5 small incisions are made on the abdomen. The abdomen is filled with carbon dioxide so that the surgeon looking through the small camera can see the area. The pyloric sphincter is then widened in the same way as in an open surgery. Pyloroplasty allows for rapid emptying of the contents of the stomach into the duodenum, but may cause reflux of contents of the small intestine back into the stomach.

There are multiple types of pyloroplasty techniques. The most commonly performed pyloroplasty is known as Heineke-Mikulicz pyloroplasty. This type consists of a transversely closed longitudinal incision across the pylorus. Another technique is known as Jaboulay pyloroplasty, which is not a pylorus incision, but a side-to-side gastroduodenostomy. Lastly, Finney pyloroplasty is the same technique as Jaboulay pyloroplasty, but also with a pylorus incision.

After the surgery, the patient’s breathing, blood pressure, temperature, heart rate, fluid intake and output, respiration, and operative site will be monitored. Typically, about 8 hours after surgery the patient may be able to walk a short distance, and walk increasing distances over the next 2–3 days. Most patients are released after 24 hours and recover quickly and completely. Most people can slowly begin a regular diet within 2–3 weeks.

== Risks ==
Risks include those general to surgery, such as reactions to medications, bleeding, blood clots, or infection. Risks specific to pyloroplasty include damage to the intestines, chronic diarrhea, mucosal perforations, leakage of the contents of the stomach, malnutrition, bile reflux, vomiting, and hernias.

== Alternatives ==
Some variants of pyloroplasty are Pyloric dilatation and pyloromyotomy, which are less invasive. Alternative procedures to pyloroplasty include gastrojejunostomy and antrectomy.
