= Temafloxacin =

Chemical compound, antibiotic drug

Clinical data
- Trade names: Omniflox
- Routes of administration: Oral
- ATC code: J01MA05 (WHO)

Legal status
- Legal status: Withdrawn

Identifiers
- IUPAC name: 1-(2,4-Difluorophenyl)-6-fluoro-7-(3-methylpiperazin-1-yl)-4-oxoquinoline-3-carboxylic acid
- CAS Number: 108319-06-8
- PubChem CID: 60021
- DrugBank: DB01405
- ChemSpider: 54143
- UNII: 1WZ12GTT67
- KEGG: D02469
- ChEBI: CHEBI:77788
- ChEMBL: ChEMBL277100
- CompTox Dashboard (EPA): DTXSID7044132

Chemical and physical data
- Formula: C_{21}H_{18}F_{3}N_{3}O_{3}
- Molar mass: 417.388 g·mol^{−1}
- 3D model (JSmol): Interactive image
- SMILES: Fc1ccc(c(F)c1)N\3c2cc(c(F)cc2C(=O)C(/C(=O)O)=C/3)N4CC(NCC4)C
- InChI: InChI=1S/C21H18F3N3O3/c1-11-9-26(5-4-25-11)19-8-18-13(7-16(19)24)20(28)14(21(29)30)10-27(18)17-3-2-12(22)6-15(17)23/h2-3,6-8,10-11,25H,4-5,9H2,1H3,(H,29,30); Key:QKDHBVNJCZBTMR-UHFFFAOYSA-N

Temafloxacin (marketed by Abbott Laboratories as Omniflox) is a fluoroquinolone antibiotic drug which was withdrawn from sale in the United States shortly after its approval in 1992 because of serious adverse effects resulting in three deaths. It is not marketed in Europe.

== History ==
Omniflox was approved to treat lower respiratory tract infections, genital and urinary infections like prostatitis, and skin infections in the United States by the Food and Drug Administration in January 1992. Severe adverse reactions, including allergic reactions and hemolytic anemia, developed in over 100 patients during the first four months of its use, leading to three patient deaths. Abbott withdrew the drug from sale in June 1992.

== Pharmacokinetics ==
Following oral administration the compound is well absorbed from the gastrointestinal tract. The oral bioavailability is greater than 90%. Temafloxacin has a good tissue penetration in various biological fluids and tissues, particularly in the respiratory tissues, nasal secretions, tonsils, prostate and bone. In these districts the concentrations achieved are equal to or higher than those in serum. The fluoroquinolone has a 7-8 hour half-life. The penetration into the central nervous system (CNS)is less pronounced. The excretion from the body is primarily due to glomerular filtration in the kidneys.

== Clinical uses ==
The compound was indicated for treating lower respiratory tract infections (community-acquired pneumonia, exacerbations of chronic bronchitis), genital and urinary tract infections (prostatitis, gonococcal and non-gonococcal urethritis, cervicitis), skin and soft tissue infections.

== See also ==
- Quinolone antibiotic
