= Gatifloxacin =

Chemical compound

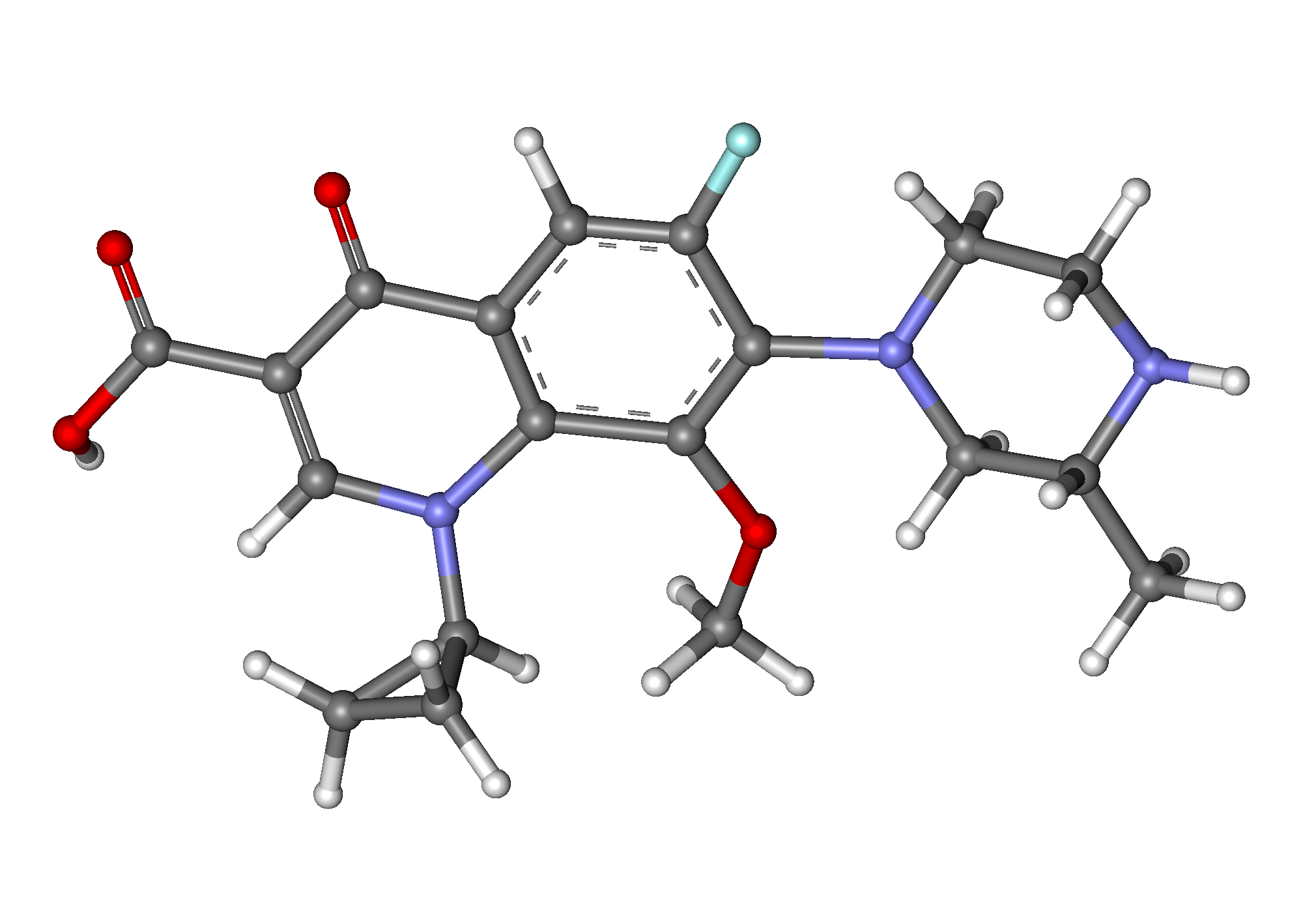

Clinical data
- Trade names: Gatiflo, Tequin, Zymar, others
- AHFS/Drugs.com: Monograph
- MedlinePlus: a605012
- Routes of administration: Oral (discontinued), Intravenous (discontinued) ophthalmic
- ATC code: J01MA16 (WHO) S01AE06 (WHO)

Legal status
- Legal status: In general: ℞ (Prescription only)

Pharmacokinetic data
- Protein binding: 20%
- Elimination half-life: 7 to 14 hours

Identifiers
- IUPAC name: 1-Cyclopropyl-6-fluoro-8-methoxy-7-(3-methylpiperazin-1-yl)-4-oxo-quinoline-3-carboxylic acid
- CAS Number: 112811-59-3
- PubChem CID: 5379
- DrugBank: DB01044
- ChemSpider: 5186
- UNII: 81485Y3A9A
- KEGG: D08011
- ChEBI: CHEBI:5280
- ChEMBL: ChEMBL31
- NIAID ChemDB: 044913
- CompTox Dashboard (EPA): DTXSID5045704
- ECHA InfoCard: 100.190.526

Chemical and physical data
- Formula: C_{19}H_{22}FN_{3}O_{4}
- Molar mass: 375.400 g·mol^{−1}
- 3D model (JSmol): Interactive image
- SMILES: Fc1c(c(OC)c2c(c1)C(=O)C(\C(=O)O)=C/N2C3CC3)N4CC(NCC4)C
- InChI: InChI=1S/C19H22FN3O4/c1-10-8-22(6-5-21-10)16-14(20)7-12-15(18(16)27-2)23(11-3-4-11)9-13(17(12)24)19(25)26/h7,9-11,21H,3-6,8H2,1-2H3,(H,25,26); Key:XUBOMFCQGDBHNK-UHFFFAOYSA-N

Gatifloxacin (brand names Gatiflo, Tequin, and Zymar) is an antibiotic of the fourth-generation fluoroquinolone family that, like other members of that family, inhibits the bacterial enzymes DNA gyrase and topoisomerase IV.

It was patented in 1986 and approved for medical use in 1999.

== Side effects ==
A Canadian study published in the New England Journal of Medicine in March 2006, claimed that Tequin can have significant side effects including dysglycemia. An editorial by Jerry Gurwitz in the same issue called for the Food and Drug Administration (FDA) to consider giving Tequin a black box warning. This editorial followed distribution of a letter dated February 15 by Bristol-Myers Squibb to health care providers indicating action taken with the FDA to strengthen warnings for the medication. Subsequently, Bristol-Myers Squibb reported it would stop manufacture of Tequin, end sales of the drug after existing stockpiles were exhausted, and return all rights to Kyorin. Other reported, albeit rare, side effects included one report of rhabdomyolysis and a few reports of heart attacks in at-risk patients.

By contrast, ophthalmic gatifloxacin is generally well tolerated. The observed systemic concentration of the drug, following oral administration, of 400 mg (0.01 ounces) gatifloxacin is approximately 800 times higher than that of the 0.5% gatifloxacin eye drop. Given as an eye drop, gatifloxacin has very low systemic exposure. Therefore, the systemic exposures resulting from the gatifloxacin ophthalmic solution are not likely to pose any risk for systemic toxicities. Some patients have reported side effects akin to allergic reactions.

== Contraindications ==
Gatifloxacin is contraindicated in patients who are hypersensitive to gatifloxacin or other quinolones.

== Society and culture ==
=== Availability ===
Gatifloxacin is currently available in the US and Canada only as an ophthalmic solution.

In 2011, the Union Health and Family Welfare Ministry of India banned the manufacture, sale, and distribution of gatifloxacin because of its adverse side effects.

In many countries, such as China, gatifloxacin is also available as tablets and in various aqueous solutions for intravenous therapy.

=== Brand names ===
Bristol-Myers Squibb introduced gatifloxacin in 1999 under the proprietary name Tequin for the treatment of respiratory tract infections, having licensed the medication from Kyorin Pharmaceutical Company of Japan.
