= Mitiglinide =

Chemical compound

Clinical data
- Trade names: Glufast
- AHFS/Drugs.com: International Drug Names
- Routes of administration: By mouth (tablets)
- ATC code: A10BX08 (WHO)

Identifiers
- IUPAC name: (−)-(2S,3a,7a-cis)-α-Benzylhexahydro-γ-oxo-2-isoindolinebutyric acid
- CAS Number: 145375-43-5
- PubChem CID: 121891
- DrugBank: DB01252
- ChemSpider: 108739
- UNII: D86I0XLB13
- KEGG: D01854
- ChEMBL: ChEMBL471498
- CompTox Dashboard (EPA): DTXSID4048303

Chemical and physical data
- Formula: C_{19}H_{25}NO_{3}
- Molar mass: 315.413 g·mol^{−1}
- 3D model (JSmol): Interactive image
- SMILES: O=C(O)[C@@H](Cc1ccccc1)CC(=O)N3C[C@H]2CCCC[C@H]2C3
- InChI: InChI=1S/C19H25NO3/c21-18(20-12-15-8-4-5-9-16(15)13-20)11-17(19(22)23)10-14-6-2-1-3-7-14/h1-3,6-7,15-17H,4-5,8-13H2,(H,22,23)/t15-,16+,17-/m0/s1; Key:WPGGHFDDFPHPOB-BBWFWOEESA-N

Mitiglinide (INN, trade name Glufast) is a drug for the treatment of type 2 diabetes.

Mitiglinide belongs to the meglitinide (glinide) class of blood glucose-lowering drugs and is currently co-marketed in Japan by Kissei and Takeda. The North America rights to mitiglinide are held by Elixir Pharmaceuticals. Mitiglinide has not yet gained FDA approval.

== Pharmacology ==
Mitiglinide is thought to stimulate insulin secretion by closing the ATP-sensitive potassium K_{ATP} channels in pancreatic β cells.

== Dosage ==
Mitiglinide is delivered in tablet form.
