= Cibenzoline =

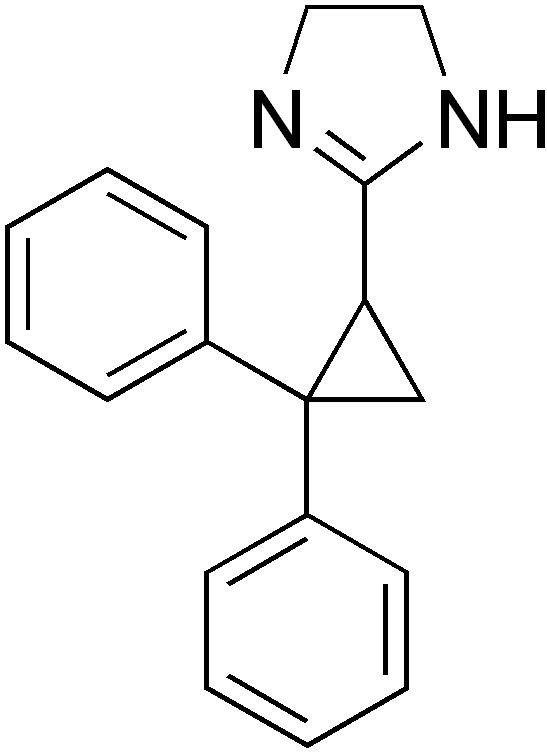

Names
- IUPAC name 2-(2,2-diphenylcyclopropyl)-4,5-dihydro-1H-imidazole

Identifiers
CAS Number	53267-01-9
3D model (JSmol)	Interactive image
ChEMBL	ChEMBL87045
ChemSpider	2645
ECHA InfoCard	100.053.122
KEGG	D03492
PubChem CID	2747
UNII	Z7489237QT
CompTox Dashboard (EPA)	DTXSID9022819
- InChI: InChI=1/C18H18N2/c1-3-7-14(8-4-1)18(15-9-5-2-6-10-15)13-16(18)17-19-11-12-20-17/h1-10,16H,11-13H2,(H,19,20) Key: IPOBOOXFSRWSHL-UHFFFAOYAC
- SMILES: N\1=C(\NCC/1)C4CC4(c2ccccc2)c3ccccc3

Properties
Chemical formula	C_{18}H_{18}N_{2}
Molar mass	262.35 g/mol

Pharmacology
ATC code	C01BG07 (WHO)
- Except where otherwise noted, data are given for materials in their standard state (at 25 °C [77 °F], 100 kPa). Infobox references

Cibenzoline (or cifenline) is a Class Ia antiarrhythmic drug.

Pituxate & Ecipramidil are other gem-diphenyl cyclopropanyl drugs.
