= Repaglinide =

Chemical compound

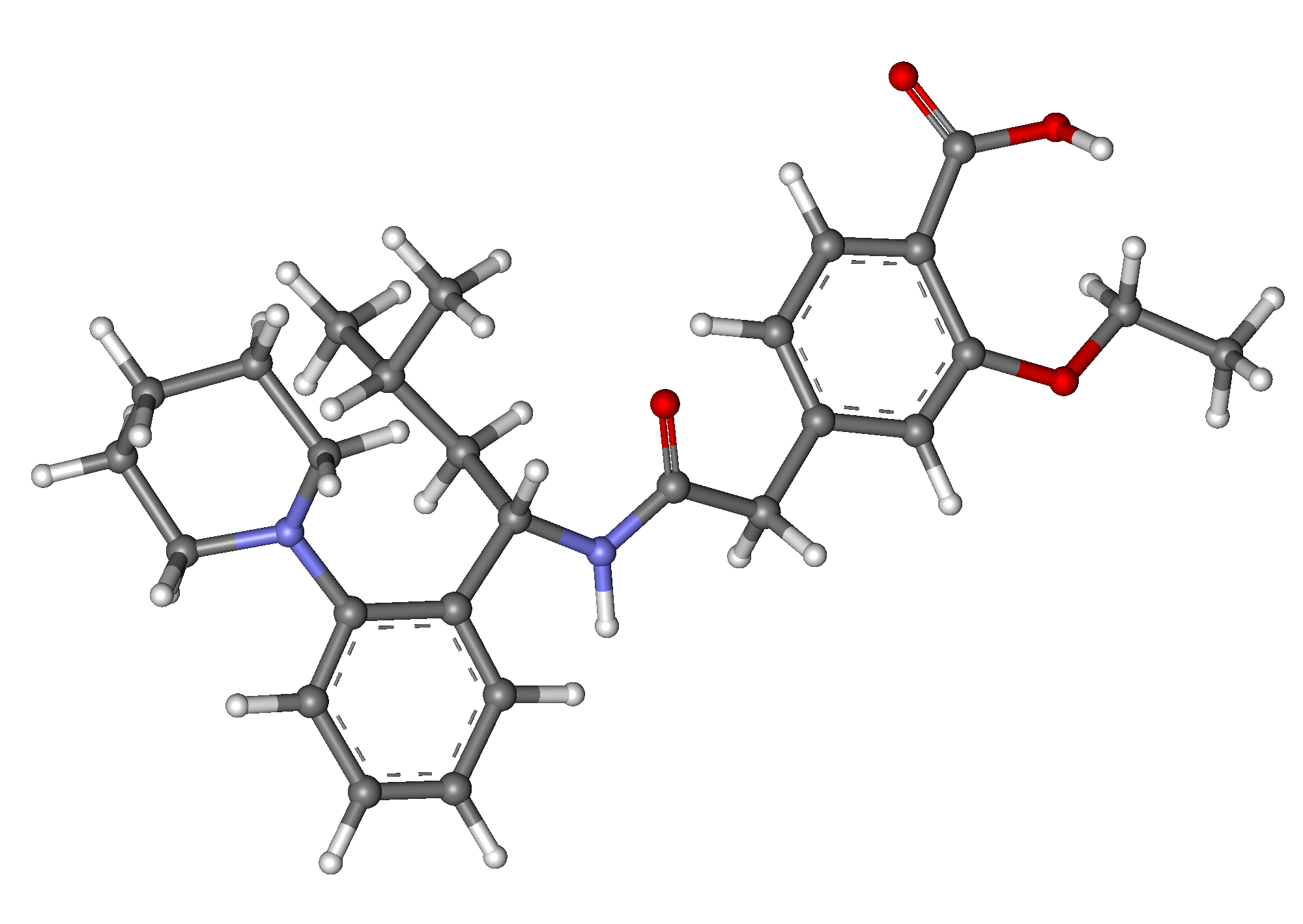

Clinical data
- Trade names: Prandin, Novonorm, Enyglid, others
- AHFS/Drugs.com: Monograph
- MedlinePlus: a600010
- License data: EU EMA: by INN; US DailyMed: Repaglinide; US FDA: Prandin
- Pregnancy category: AU: C
- Routes of administration: By mouth
- ATC code: A10BX02 (WHO)

Legal status
- Legal status: AU: S4 (Prescription only); CA: ℞-only; UK: POM (Prescription only); US: ℞-only; EU: Rx-only

Pharmacokinetic data
- Bioavailability: 56% (oral)
- Protein binding: >98%
- Metabolism: Liver oxidation and glucuronidation (CYP3A4-mediated)
- Elimination half-life: 1 hour
- Excretion: Fecal (90%) and kidney (8%)

Identifiers
- IUPAC name: (S)-2-Ethoxy-4-(1-[2-{piperidin-1-yl}phenyl]-3-methylbutylcarbamoylmethyl)benzoic acid
- CAS Number: 135062-02-1
- PubChem CID: 65981
- IUPHAR/BPS: 6841
- DrugBank: DB00912
- ChemSpider: 59377
- UNII: 668Z8C33LU
- KEGG: D00594
- ChEMBL: ChEMBL1272
- CompTox Dashboard (EPA): DTXSID3023552
- ECHA InfoCard: 100.158.190

Chemical and physical data
- Formula: C_{27}H_{36}N_{2}O_{4}
- Molar mass: 452.595 g·mol^{−1}
- 3D model (JSmol): Interactive image
- Melting point: 126 to 128 °C (259 to 262 °F)
- SMILES: O=C(O)c1ccc(cc1OCC)CC(=O)N[C@H](c2ccccc2N3CCCCC3)CC(C)C
- InChI: InChI=1S/C27H36N2O4/c1-4-33-25-17-20(12-13-22(25)27(31)32)18-26(30)28-23(16-19(2)3)21-10-6-7-11-24(21)29-14-8-5-9-15-29/h6-7,10-13,17,19,23H,4-5,8-9,14-16,18H2,1-3H3,(H,28,30)(H,31,32)/t23-/m0/s1; Key:FAEKWTJYAYMJKF-QHCPKHFHSA-N

Repaglinide is an antidiabetic drug in the class of medications known as meglitinides, and was invented in 1983. Repaglinide is a medication used in addition to diet and exercise for blood sugar control in type 2 diabetes. The mechanism of action of repaglinide involves promoting insulin release from β-islet cells of the pancreas; like other antidiabetic drugs, a main side effect concern is hypoglycemia. It is sold by Novo under the name of Prandin in the United States, GlucoNorm in Canada, Surepost in Japan, Repaglinide in Egypt, and NovoNorm elsewhere. In Japan it is produced by Sumitomo Pharma.

== Medical uses ==
Repaglinide is an oral medication used in addition to diet and exercise for blood sugar control in type 2 diabetes.

== Contraindications ==
Repaglinide is contraindicated in people with:

1. Diabetic ketoacidosis, with or without coma
2. Type 1 diabetes
3. Co-administration with gemfibrozil
4. Known hypersensitivity to drug or inactive ingredients

== Adverse events ==
Common adverse events include:

Metabolic

- Hypoglycemia (31%)

Respiratory

- Upper respiratory infection (16%)
- Sinusitis (6%)
- Rhinitis (3%)

Gastrointestinal

- Nausea (5%)
- Diarrhea (5%)
- Constipation (3%)
- Vomiting (3%)

Musculoskeletal

- Arthralgia (6%)
- Back Pain (5%)

Other

- Headache (11%)
- Paresthesia (3%)

Serious adverse events include:

- Cardiac ischemia (2%)
- Angina (1.8%)
- Deaths due to cardiovascular events (0.5%)

== Special populations ==
Pregnancy category C: safety in pregnant women has not been established. Data is limited, and there is only one case report that notes no complications with the use of repaglinide during pregnancy.

Caution should be taken in people with liver disease and decreased kidney function when using this medication.

== Drug interactions ==
Repaglinide is a major substrate of CYP3A4 and should not be administered concomitantly with gemfibrozil, clarithromycin or azole antifungals such as itraconazole or ketoconazole. Administration of both repaglinide and one or more of these drugs results in an increase in plasma concentration of repaglinide and may lead to hypoglycemia. Co-administration of repaglinide and clopidogrel (a CYP2C8 inhibitor) may lead to a significant decrease in blood glucose levels due to a drug-drug interaction. In fact, using these drugs together for even one day can cause repaglinide levels to increase over 5-fold...and may lead to significant hypoglycemia. Repaglinide should not be combined with sulfonylurea, because they have the same mechanism of action.

== Pharmacology ==
=== Mechanism of action ===
Repaglinide lowers blood glucose by stimulating the release of insulin from the beta islet cells of the pancreas. It achieves this by closing ATP-dependent potassium channels in the membrane of the beta cells. This depolarizes the beta cells, opening the cells' calcium channels, and the resulting calcium influx induces insulin secretion.

=== Pharmacokinetics ===
Absorption: repaglinide has a 56% bioavailability when absorbed from the gastrointestinal tract. Bioavailability is reduced when taken with food; the maximum concentration decreases by 20%.

Distribution: The protein binding of repalglinide to albumin is greater than 98%.

Metabolism: repaglinide is primarily metabolized by the liver - specifically CYP450 2C8 and 3A4 - and to a lesser extent via glucuronidation. Metabolites of repaglinide are inactive and do not display glucose-lowering effects.

Excretion: repaglinide is 90% excreted in the feces and 8% in the urine. 0.1% is cleared unchanged in the urine. Less than 2% is unchanged in the feces.

== History ==
Precursor drugs to repaglinide were invented in late 1983 by scientists at Dr Karl Thomae GmbH, a German drug manufacturer located at Biberach an der Riß in southern Germany which was acquired by Boehringer Ingelheim in 1990. The drug that became repaglinide was later licensed by Boehringer to Novo, which filed an Investigational New Drug application for the compound with the Food and Drug Administration (FDA) in April 1992. Novo Nordisk filed its New Drug Application (NDA) for Prandin in July 1997 and it was quickly approved, gaining FDA approval in December 1997. The drug was the first of the meglitinide class. It was branded Prandin because its quick onset and short duration of action concentrates its effect around meal time (the prandium was the Roman meal which is comparable to the modern lunch).

== Intellectual property ==
After several attempts to file for U.S. patent protection, a filing was made in March 1990 which eventually became U.S. Patents 5,216,167 (June 1993), 5,312,924 (May 1994) and 6,143,769 (November 2000). After filing its NDA for repaglinide in 1997, Novo applied for patent extension under the Hatch-Waxman Act. This process, called patent term restoration, allows drug patents to be extended based on the time that a drug spent in clinical trials and in the approval process. Previously it had been decided by the U.S. Patent and Trademark Office that the expiration date of U.S. Patents 5,216,167 and 5,312,924 would be 5 September 2006. In February 2001 Prandin's patent life was extended to 14 March 2009 in response to Novo's patent term restoration application, with U.S. Patent 5,216,167 having been reissued as RE37035.

Prior to the end of repaglinide's patent term, Novo obtained a new patent, U.S. Patent 6,677,358 (January 2004), covering the combination therapy of repaglinide together with the generic anti-diabetic drug metformin. This new patent was due to expire June 2018. In January 2011, a federal court ruled Novo's new patent invalid on the grounds of obviousness, and unenforceable on the grounds of inequitable conduct on the part of Novo's patent attorneys.
