= Glisoxepide =

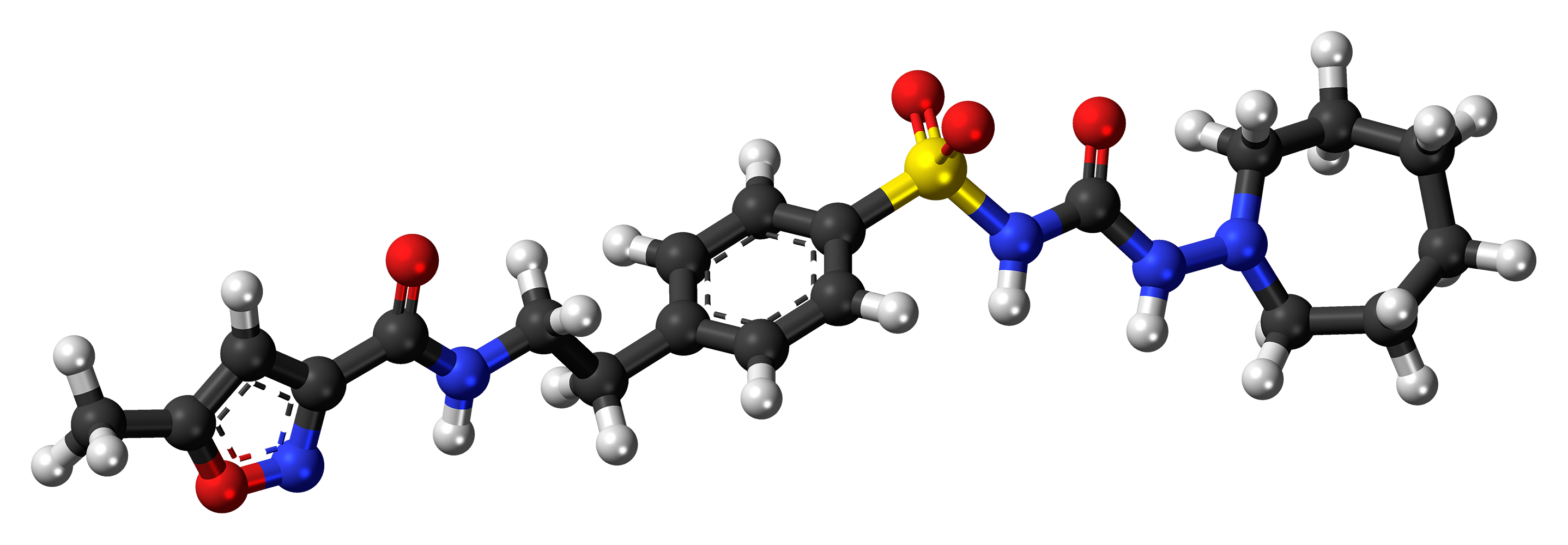

Names
- Preferred IUPAC name N-[2-(4-{[(Azepan-1-yl)carbamoyl]sulfamoyl}phenyl)ethyl]-5-methyl-1,2-oxazole-3-carboxamide

Identifiers
CAS Number	25046-79-1
3D model (JSmol)	Interactive image
ChEMBL	ChEMBL2106618
ChemSpider	30380
DrugBank	DB01289
ECHA InfoCard	100.042.329
KEGG	D07118
PubChem CID	32778
UNII	H7SC0I332I
CompTox Dashboard (EPA)	DTXSID9023097
- InChI: InChI=1S/C20H27N5O5S/c1-15-14-18(23-30-15)19(26)21-11-10-16-6-8-17(9-7-16)31(28,29)24-20(27)22-25-12-4-2-3-5-13-25/h6-9,14H,2-5,10-13H2,1H3,(H,21,26)(H2,22,24,27) Key: ZKUDBRCEOBOWLF-UHFFFAOYSA-N; InChI=1/C20H27N5O5S/c1-15-14-18(23-30-15)19(26)21-11-10-16-6-8-17(9-7-16)31(28,29)24-20(27)22-25-12-4-2-3-5-13-25/h6-9,14H,2-5,10-13H2,1H3,(H,21,26)(H2,22,24,27) Key: ZKUDBRCEOBOWLF-UHFFFAOYAG
- SMILES: O=C(NCCc1ccc(cc1)S(=O)(=O)NC(=O)NN2CCCCCC2)c3noc(c3)C

Properties
Chemical formula	C_{20}H_{27}N_{5}O_{5}S
Molar mass	449.52388 g/mol

Pharmacology
ATC code	A10BB11 (WHO)
- Except where otherwise noted, data are given for materials in their standard state (at 25 °C [77 °F], 100 kPa). verify (what is ?) Infobox references

Glisoxepide (INN) is an orally available anti-diabetic drug from the group of sulfonylureas. It belongs to second-generation sulfonylureas.
