= Doege–Potter syndrome =

Hypoglycemia (low blood sugar) due to the presence of fibrous tumors

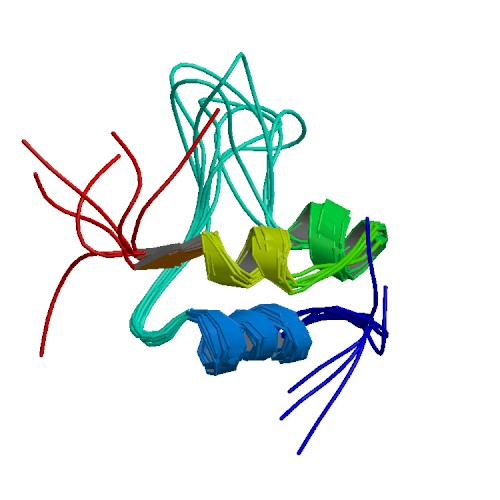
- The structure of IGF-2, responsible for the hypoglycemia associated with Doege–Potter syndrome
- Specialty: Oncology

Doege–Potter syndrome (DPS) is a paraneoplastic syndrome in which hypoglycemia is associated with solitary fibrous tumors. The hypoglycemia is the result of the tumors producing insulin-like growth factor 2. The syndrome was first described in 1930, by Karl Walter Doege (1867–1932), a German-American physician and by Roy Pilling Potter (1879–1968), an American radiologist, working independently; the full term Doege–Potter syndrome was infrequently used until the publication of a 2000 article using the eponym.

DPS is rare (as of 1976, less than one hundred cases were described), with a malignancy rate of 12–15%. Actual rates of hypoglycemia associated with a fibrous tumor are quite rare (a 1981 study of 360 solitary fibrous tumors of the lungs found that only 4% caused hypoglycemia), and are linked to large tumors with high rates of mitosis. Removal of the tumor will normally resolve the symptoms.

Tumors causing DPS tend to be quite large; in one case a 3 kg (6.6 lb), 23×21×12 cm (9.1×8.3×4.7 in) mass was removed, sufficiently large to cause a collapsed lung. In X-rays, they appear as a single mass with visible, defined borders, appearing at the edges of the lungs or a fissure dividing the lobes of the lungs. Similar hypoglycemic effects have been related to mesenchymal tumors.
