= Leucine-sensitive hypoglycemia of infancy =

- Other names: Hypoglycemia leucine-induced; hypoglycemia leucine induced; familial infantile hypoglycemia precipitated by leucine

Leucine-sensitive hypoglycemia of infancy is a type of metabolic disorder. It is inherited in an autosomal dominant fashion. It is rare.

== Names ==
Other names include hypoglycemia leucine-induced; hypoglycemia leucine induced; and familial infantile hypoglycemia precipitated by leucine.
