= Diazoxide =

Medication used to treat low blood sugar and high blood pressure

Clinical data
- Trade names: Proglycem, Vykat XR, others
- AHFS/Drugs.com: Monograph
- License data: US DailyMed: Diazoxide
- Pregnancy category: AU: C
- Routes of administration: Oral, intravenous
- ATC code: C02DA01 (WHO) V03AH01 (WHO)

Legal status
- Legal status: CA: ℞-only; UK: POM (Prescription only); US: ℞-only

Pharmacokinetic data
- Protein binding: >90%
- Metabolism: Liver oxidation and sulfate conjugation
- Elimination half-life: Adults: 24–36 hours Children: 9.5–24 hours
- Excretion: Kidney

Identifiers
- IUPAC name: 7-chloro-3-methyl-4H-1,2,4-benzothiadiazine 1,1-dioxide
- CAS Number: 364-98-7
- PubChem CID: 3019
- IUPHAR/BPS: 2409
- DrugBank: DB01119
- ChemSpider: 2911
- UNII: O5CB12L4FN
- KEGG: D00294
- ChEBI: CHEBI:4495
- ChEMBL: ChEMBL181
- CompTox Dashboard (EPA): DTXSID7022914
- ECHA InfoCard: 100.006.063

Chemical and physical data
- Formula: C_{8}H_{7}ClN_{2}O_{2}S
- Molar mass: 230.67 g·mol^{−1}
- 3D model (JSmol): Interactive image
- Melting point: 330 to 331 °C (626 to 628 °F)
- SMILES: Clc1ccc2c(c1)S(=O)(=O)/N=C(\N2)C
- InChI: InChI=1S/C8H7ClN2O2S/c1-5-10-7-3-2-6(9)4-8(7)14(12,13)11-5/h2-4H,1H3,(H,10,11); Key:GDLBFKVLRPITMI-UHFFFAOYSA-N

Diazoxide, sold under the brand name Proglycem among others, is a medication used to treat low blood sugar due to a number of specific causes. This includes islet cell tumors that cannot be removed and leucine sensitivity. It can also be used in refractory cases of sulfonylurea toxicity. It is taken by mouth.

Diazoxide, used as the salt diazoxide choline, and sold under the brand name Vykat XR, is used for the treatment of hyperphagia in people with Prader–Willi syndrome (PWS). It was approved for this use in the United States in March 2025.

Common side effects include high blood sugar, fluid retention, low blood platelets, a fast heart rate, increased hair growth, and nausea. Other severe side effects include pulmonary hypertension and heart failure. It is chemically similar to thiazide diuretics. It works by decreasing insulin release from the pancreas and increasing glucose release by the liver.

Diazoxide was approved for medical use in the United States in 1973. It is on the World Health Organization's List of Essential Medicines. It is available as a generic medication.

== Medical uses ==
Diazoxide is used as a vasodilator in the treatment of acute hypertension or malignant hypertension.

Diazoxide also inhibits the secretion of insulin by opening ATP-sensitive potassium channel of beta cells of the pancreas; thus, it is used to counter hypoglycemia in disease states such as insulinoma (a tumor producing insulin) or congenital hyperinsulinism.

== Side effects ==
Diazoxide interferes with insulin release through its action on potassium channels. Diazoxide is one of the most potent openers of the K+ ATP channels present on the insulin producing beta cells of the pancreas. Opening these channels leads to hyperpolarization of cell membrane, a decrease in calcium influx, and a subsequently reduced release of insulin.

The US Food and Drug Administration (FDA) published a safety announcement in July 2015 highlighting the potential for development of pulmonary hypertension in newborns and infants treated with this drug.

Diazoxide has been associated with development of hypertrichosis and stimulation of scalp hair growth.

== Pharmacology ==
=== Pharmacodynamics ===
Diazoxide acts as a ATP-sensitive potassium channel (K_{ATP}) opener.

It has been found to act as a positive allosteric modulator of the ionotropic glutamate AMPA and kainate receptors.

=== Pharmacokinetics ===
The elimination half-life of diazoxide has been reported to be 24 to 36 hours in adults and 9.5 to 24 hours in children.

== Research ==
Diazoxide was under development by Lakatos-Topol and Proanagen as a topical solution for the treatment of androgenic alopecia (pattern hair loss) and alopecia areata in the 1980s but was ultimately never marketed. It was intended as a competitor and alternative to minoxidil (Rogaine) for such purposes. The drug applied topically was found to promote scalp hair growth in balding stump-tailed macaques.

Under the name Vykat XR, diazoxide choline is an approved therapy for Prader-Willi syndrome and is under investigation for monogenic obesity caused by mutations in the SH2B1, PCSK1, or SIM1 genes.

== See also ==
- List of investigational hair loss drugs
