= Acetohexamide =

Chemical compound

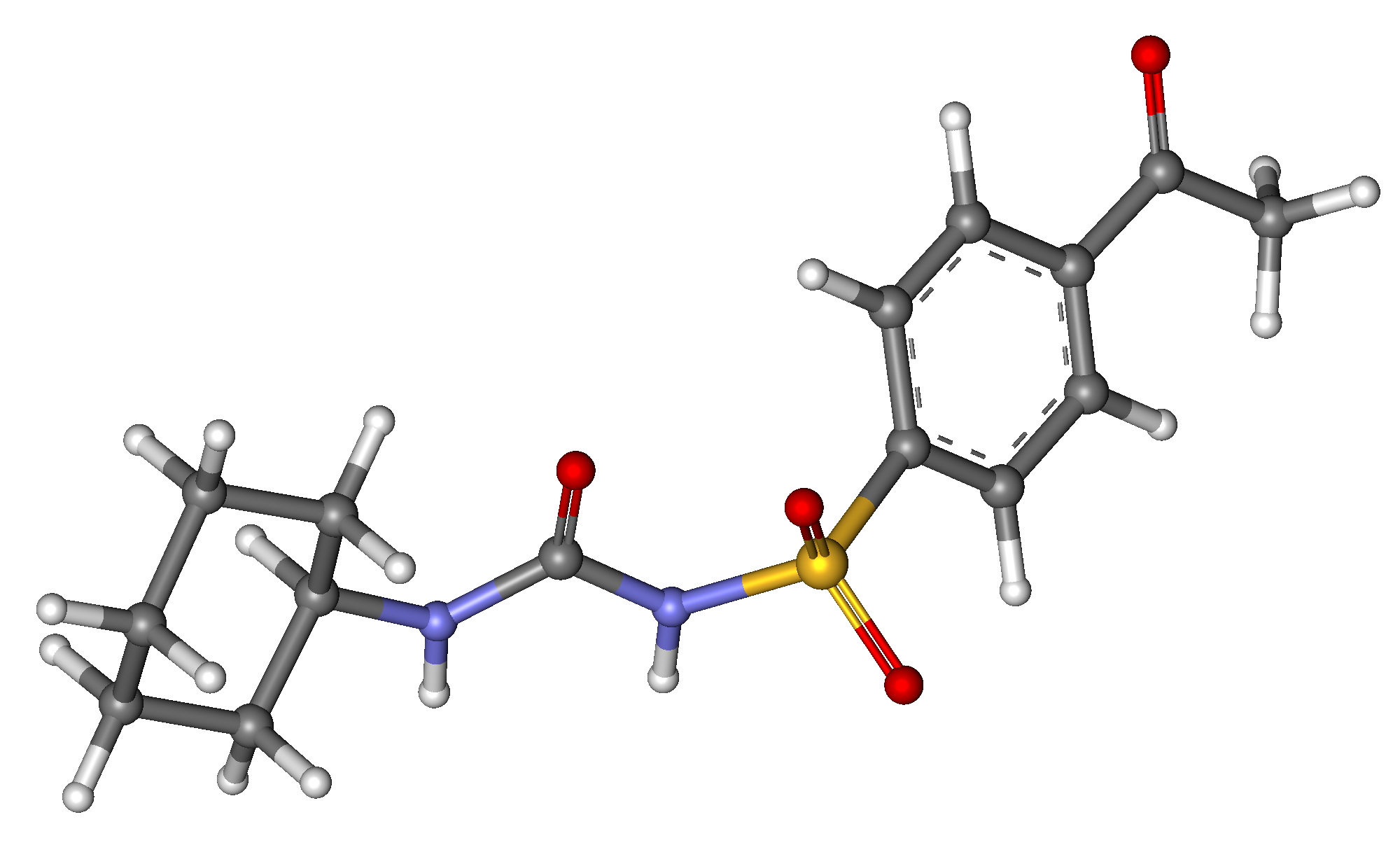

Clinical data
- Trade names: Dymelor
- AHFS/Drugs.com: Micromedex Detailed Consumer Information
- MedlinePlus: a602021
- ATC code: A10BB31 (WHO)

Pharmacokinetic data
- Protein binding: 90%

Identifiers
- IUPAC name: 1-[(4-acetylbenzene)sulfonyl]-3-cyclohexylurea 4-acetyl-N-(cyclohexylcarbamoyl)benzenesulfonamide
- CAS Number: 968-81-0
- PubChem CID: 1989
- IUPHAR/BPS: 6793
- DrugBank: DB00414
- ChemSpider: 1912
- UNII: QGC8W08I6I
- KEGG: D00219
- ChEBI: CHEBI:28052
- ChEMBL: ChEMBL1589
- CompTox Dashboard (EPA): DTXSID7020007
- ECHA InfoCard: 100.012.301

Chemical and physical data
- Formula: C_{15}H_{20}N_{2}O_{4}S
- Molar mass: 324.40 g·mol^{−1}
- 3D model (JSmol): Interactive image
- Melting point: 188 to 190 °C (370 to 374 °F)
- SMILES: O=C(NC1CCCCC1)NS(=O)(=O)c2ccc(C(=O)C)cc2
- InChI: InChI=1S/C15H20N2O4S/c1-11(18)12-7-9-14(10-8-12)22(20,21)17-15(19)16-13-5-3-2-4-6-13/h7-10,13H,2-6H2,1H3,(H2,16,17,19); Key:VGZSUPCWNCWDAN-UHFFFAOYSA-N

Acetohexamide (trade name Dymelor) is a first-generation sulfonylurea medication used to treat diabetes mellitus type 2, particularly in people whose diabetes cannot be controlled by diet alone.

== Mechanism of action ==
Acetohexamide binds to an ATP-sensitive K^{+} (K_{ATP}) channel on the cell membrane of pancreatic beta cells. This inhibits the outflux of potassium, which causes the membrane potential to become more positive. This depolarization in turn opens voltage-gated calcium channels. The rise in intracellular calcium leads to increased fusion of insulin granulae with the cell membrane, and therefore increased secretion of insulin.

== Risks ==
Sulfonylureas, especially first-generation sulfonylureas such as Acetohexamide, can cause severe hypoglycemia and increase the risk of adverse cardiovascular events.
