= Idiopathic postprandial syndrome =

Symptoms of low blood sugar (fatigue, moodiness, etc) but without cause

- Symptoms: Shakiness, sense of weakness

Idiopathic postprandial syndrome, colloquially but incorrectly known by some as hypoglycemia, describes a collection of clinical signs and symptoms similar to medical hypoglycemia but without the demonstrably low blood glucose levels which characterize said condition.

People with this condition have recurrent episodes of altered mood and cognitive dysfunction, often accompanied by weakness and adrenergic symptoms such as shakiness. The episodes typically occur a few hours after a meal, rather than after many hours of fasting. The principal treatments recommended are extra small meals or snacks and avoidance of excessive simple sugars.

== Signs and symptoms ==
The symptoms include many of the symptoms associated with milder degrees of hypoglycemia, especially the adrenergic symptoms, but do not progress to objective impairment of brain function, seizures, coma, or brain damage.

- Shakiness
- Sense of weakness
- Altered or depressed mood
- Confusion
- Fatigue
- Anxiety
- Paleness
- Perspiration
- Increased pulse or respiratory rate
- Hunger

== Etymology and history of diagnosis ==
The term idiopathic postprandial syndrome, which literally means a syndrome that occurs after eating (postprandial) and is of unknown cause (idiopathic), was coined in an attempt to reserve the term hypoglycemia for those conditions in which low glucose levels could be demonstrated. It was offered as a less confusing alternative to functional hypoglycemia and as a less pejorative alternative to "nonhypoglycemia" or "pseudohypoglycemia".

The syndrome resembles reactive hypoglycemia except that low glucose is not found at the time of symptoms.

The common usage of the term "hypoglycemia" was noted and countered by doctors writing in the Journal of the American Medical Association in the 1970s:

The "syndrome of hypoglycemia" has become popular among patients and physicians alike, primarily because it seems to provide an explanation (?) for obscure symptoms, and it gives the patient something to do, ie, manipulate his or her diet continuously. Here is where the concept of "hypoglycemia" as a disorder meets up with all other modern dietary fads such as "natural" foods, vitamin "lack", and "organic" foods. It is also an area in which the hormones are involved. Hence "glandular causes" and "glandular therapy" play a large role.

The author said "a cult has developed, consisting of a believing public aided and abetted by 'nutritionists', medical journalists, and a host of physicians."

Hypoglycemia enjoys a popular position in the public's eye as a non-specific medical condition that frequently provides an explanation for the varied symptoms that occur in daily life.

These doctors cautioned against the over-diagnosis of reactive hypoglycemia. They said "both physicians and the public deserve major re-education."

=== Non-disease ===
In October 1974, The New England Journal of Medicine carried an article "Non-hypoglycemia as an epidemic condition" which described the condition as a "non-disease". The authors claim

Over the past few years people have appeared in droves with the self-diagnosis of "hypoglycemia" – a term that has become the layman's final common pathway for a variety of conditions, only a few of which are related to endocrinologic abnormalities.
Most common are somatic complaints such as fatigue, spasms, palpitation, numbness and tingling, pains, severe sweating and mental dullness.
Hypoglycemia provides all at once a socially acceptable problem, a quasi-physiologic explanation and the promise of a relatively inexpensive and successful self-help program.

The same issue of the Journal carried a "non-editorial on non-hypoglycemia" that acknowledged the "current popular epidemic of non-hypoglycemia" and proposed the term "clinical pseudo-hypoglycemia". After describing the known mechanisms of blood glucose regulation, the authors call for more research:

The body's normal response to carbohydrate ingestion includes elaboration of an as yet unidentified hormonal (gut) factor from the upper intestine.

They say that a glucose tolerance test is appropriate but caution that:

It must be kept in mind that the oral glucose load is far from a normal physiologic meal, and tests only glucose as the provocateur, whereas protein might be as much at fault by stimulating over-production of the gut factor, probably pancreozymin. Thus much more research is indicated to define the norms as well as to characterize the role and nature of the various gut factors and the responses of the beta cells to these factors.

== Adrenergic postprandial syndrome ==
There is some evidence of the existence of a so-called "adrenergic postprandial syndrome": the blood glucose level is normal, and the symptoms are caused through autonomic adrenergic response. Often, this syndrome is associated with emotional distress and anxious behaviour of the patient.

== See also ==
- Chronic Somogyi rebound (The "Somogyi effect")
- Idiopathic hypoglycemia
- Reactive hypoglycemia
