= Gliquidone =

Chemical compound

Clinical data
- Trade names: Glurenorm
- AHFS/Drugs.com: International Drug Names
- Pregnancy category: C
- Routes of administration: Oral (tablets)
- ATC code: A10BB08 (WHO)

Legal status
- Legal status: UK: POM (Prescription only); In general: ℞ (Prescription only)

Pharmacokinetic data
- Bioavailability: High (T_{max} = 2–3 hours)
- Metabolism: Extensive hepatic
- Onset of action: 1–1.5 hours
- Excretion: Biliary (95%), renal (5%)

Identifiers
- IUPAC name: 1-cyclohexyl-3-[4-[2-(7-methoxy-4,4-dimethyl-1,3-dioxoisoquinolin-2-yl)ethyl]phenyl]sulfonylurea
- CAS Number: 33342-05-1
- PubChem CID: 91610
- DrugBank: DB01251
- ChemSpider: 82719
- UNII: C7C2QDD75P
- KEGG: D02430
- ChEMBL: ChEMBL383634
- CompTox Dashboard (EPA): DTXSID4023096
- ECHA InfoCard: 100.046.770

Chemical and physical data
- Formula: C_{27}H_{33}N_{3}O_{6}S
- Molar mass: 527.64 g·mol^{−1}
- 3D model (JSmol): Interactive image
- SMILES: O=C(NC1CCCCC1)NS(=O)(=O)c2ccc(cc2)CCN4C(=O)c3c(ccc(OC)c3)C(C4=O)(C)C
- InChI: InChI=1S/C27H33N3O6S/c1-27(2)23-14-11-20(36-3)17-22(23)24(31)30(25(27)32)16-15-18-9-12-21(13-10-18)37(34,35)29-26(33)28-19-7-5-4-6-8-19/h9-14,17,19H,4-8,15-16H2,1-3H3,(H2,28,29,33); Key:LLJFMFZYVVLQKT-UHFFFAOYSA-N

Gliquidone (INN, sold under the trade name Glurenorm) is an anti-diabetic medication in the sulfonylurea class. It is classified as a second-generation sulfonylurea. It is used in the treatment of diabetes mellitus type 2. It is marketed by the pharmaceutical company Boehringer Ingelheim (Germany).

== Contraindications ==
- Allergy to sulfonylureas or sulfonamides
- Diabetes mellitus type 1
- Diabetic ketoacidosis
- Patients that underwent removal of the pancreas
- Acute porphyria
- Severe liver disease accompanying with liver insufficiency
- Several conditions (e.g., infectious diseases or major surgical intervention), when insulin administration is required
- Pregnancy or breastfeeding

== Pharmacokinetics ==
Gliquidone is fully metabolized by the liver. Its metabolites are excreted virtually completely with bile (even with long-term administration), thus allowing the use of medication in diabetic patients with kidney disease and diabetic nephropathy.
