= Reactive hypoglycemia =

Medical condition

- Other names: Postprandial hypoglycemia, sugar crash
- Symptoms: Clumsiness, difficulty talking, confusion, loss of consciousness, and other symptoms related to hypoglycemia
- Usual onset: Within 4 hours of a high carbohydrate meal
- Causes: Gastric bypass surgery, over-secretion of insulin
- Diagnostic method: Whipple criteria, blood glucose test during spontaneous occurrence of symptoms, HbA1c blood test, 6-hour glucose tolerance test
- Differential diagnosis: Alimentary hypoglycemia, factitious hypoglycemia, insulin autoimmune hypoglycemia, noninsulinoma pancreatogenous hypoglycemia syndrome, insulinoma, hereditary fructose intolerance
- Prevention: Low-carbohydrate diet, frequent small meals

Reactive hypoglycemia, postprandial hypoglycemia, or sugar crash is symptomatic hypoglycemia occurring within four hours of a high-carbohydrate meal in people with and without diabetes. The term is not necessarily a diagnosis since it requires an evaluation to determine the cause of the hypoglycemia.

The condition is related to homeostatic systems used by the body to control the blood sugar level. It is described as a sense of tiredness, lethargy, irritation, or hangover, although the effects can be lessened if a lot of physical activity is undertaken in the first few hours after food consumption.

The alleged mechanism for the feeling of a crash is correlated with an abnormally rapid rise in blood glucose after eating. This normally leads to insulin secretion (known as an insulin spike), which in turn initiates rapid glucose uptake by tissues, either storing it as glycogen or fat, or using it for energy production. The consequent fall in blood glucose is indicated as the reason for the "sugar crash". Another cause might be hysteresis effect of insulin action, i.e., the effect of insulin is still prominent even if both plasma glucose and insulin levels were already low, causing a plasma glucose level eventually much lower than the baseline level.

Sugar crashes are not to be confused with the after-effects of consuming large amounts of protein, which produces fatigue akin to a sugar crash, but are instead the result of the body prioritising the digestion of ingested food.

The prevalence of this condition is difficult to ascertain because a number of stricter or looser definitions have been used. It is recommended that the term reactive hypoglycemia be reserved for the pattern of postprandial hypoglycemia which meets the Whipple criteria (symptoms correspond to measurably low glucose and are relieved by raising the glucose), and that the term idiopathic postprandial syndrome be used for similar patterns of symptoms where abnormally low glucose levels at the time of symptoms cannot be documented.

To assist in diagnosis, a doctor may order an HbA1c test, which measures the blood sugar average over the two or three months before the test. The more specific 6-hour glucose tolerance test can be used to chart changes in the patient's blood sugar levels before ingestion of a special glucose drink and at regular intervals during the six hours following to see if an unusual rise or drop in blood glucose levels occurs.

According to the U.S. National Institutes of Health (NIH), a blood glucose level below 70 mg/dL (3.9 mmol/L) at the time of symptoms followed by relief after eating confirms a diagnosis for reactive hypoglycemia.

== Signs and symptoms ==
Symptoms vary according to individuals' hydration level and sensitivity to the rate and/or magnitude of decline of their blood glucose concentration.

A crash is usually felt within four hours of heavy carbohydrate consumption. Along with the symptoms of hypoglycemia, symptoms of reactive hypoglycemia include:

- double vision or blurry vision
- unclear thinking
- brain fog
- insomnia
- heart palpitation or fibrillation
- fatigue
- dizziness
- light-headedness
- sweating
- headaches
- depression
- nervousness
- muscle twitches
- irritability
- tremors
- flushing
- craving sweets
- increased appetite
- rhinitis
- nausea, vomiting
- panic attack
- numbness/coldness in the extremities
- confusion
- irrationality
- hot flashes
- bad temper
- paleness
- anxiety
- trouble talking
- cold hands
- disorientation
- the need to sleep or 'crash'

The majority of these symptoms, often correlated with feelings of hunger, mimic the effect of inadequate sugar intake as the biology of a crash is similar in itself to the body's response to low blood sugar levels following periods of glucose deficiency.

== Causes ==
The NIH states: "The causes of most cases of reactive hypoglycemia are still open to debate. Some researchers suggest that certain people may be more sensitive to the body's normal release of the hormone epinephrine, which causes many of the symptoms of hypoglycemia. Others believe deficiencies in glucagon secretion might lead to reactive hypoglycemia.

Several other hormones are responsible for modulating the body's response to insulin, including cortisol, growth hormone and sex hormones. Untreated or under-treated hormonal disorders such as adrenal insufficiency (see also Addison's disease) or growth hormone deficiency can therefore sometimes cause insulin hypersensitivity, and reactive hypoglycemia.

Stomach bypass surgery or hereditary fructose intolerance are believed to be causes, albeit uncommon, of reactive hypoglycemia. Myo-inositol or 1D-chiro-inositol withdrawal can cause temporary reactive hypoglycemia.

There are several kinds of reactive hypoglycemia:

1. Alimentary hypoglycemia (consequence of dumping syndrome; it occurs in about 15% of people who have had stomach surgery)
2. Hormonal hypoglycemia (e.g., hypothyroidism)
3. Helicobacter pylori-induced gastritis (some reports suggest this bacteria may contribute to the occurrence of reactive hypoglycemia)
4. Congenital enzyme deficiencies (hereditary fructose intolerance, galactosemia, and leucine sensitivity of childhood)
5. Late hypoglycemia (occult diabetes; characterized by a delay in early insulin release from pancreatic beta-cells, resulting in initial exaggeration of hyperglycemia during a glucose tolerance test)

"Idiopathic reactive hypoglycemia" is a term no longer used because researchers now know the underlying causes of reactive hypoglycemia and have the tools to perform the diagnosis and the pathophysiological data explaining the mechanisms.

To check if there is real hypoglycemia when symptoms occur, neither an oral glucose tolerance test nor a breakfast test is effective; instead, a hyperglucidic breakfast test or ambulatory glucose testing is the current standard.

The body requires a relatively constant input of glucose, a sugar produced upon digestion of carbohydrates, for normal functioning. Glucagon and insulin are among the hormones that ensure a normal range of glucose in the human body. Upon consumption of a meal, blood sugar normally rises, which triggers pancreatic cells to produce insulin. This hormone initiates the absorption of the just-digested blood glucose as glycogen into the liver for metabolism or storage, thereby lowering glucose levels in the blood. In contrast, the hormone glucagon is released by the pancreas as a response to lower than normal blood sugar levels. Glucagon initiates uptake of the stored glycogen in the liver into the bloodstream so as to increase glucose levels in the blood. Sporadic, high-carbohydrate snacks and meals are deemed the specific causes of sugar crashes. The "crash" one feels is due to the rapid increase and subsequent decline of blood sugar in the body system as one begins and ceases consumption of high-sugar foods. More insulin than is actually needed is produced in response to the large, rapid ingestion of sugary foods.

== Treatment ==
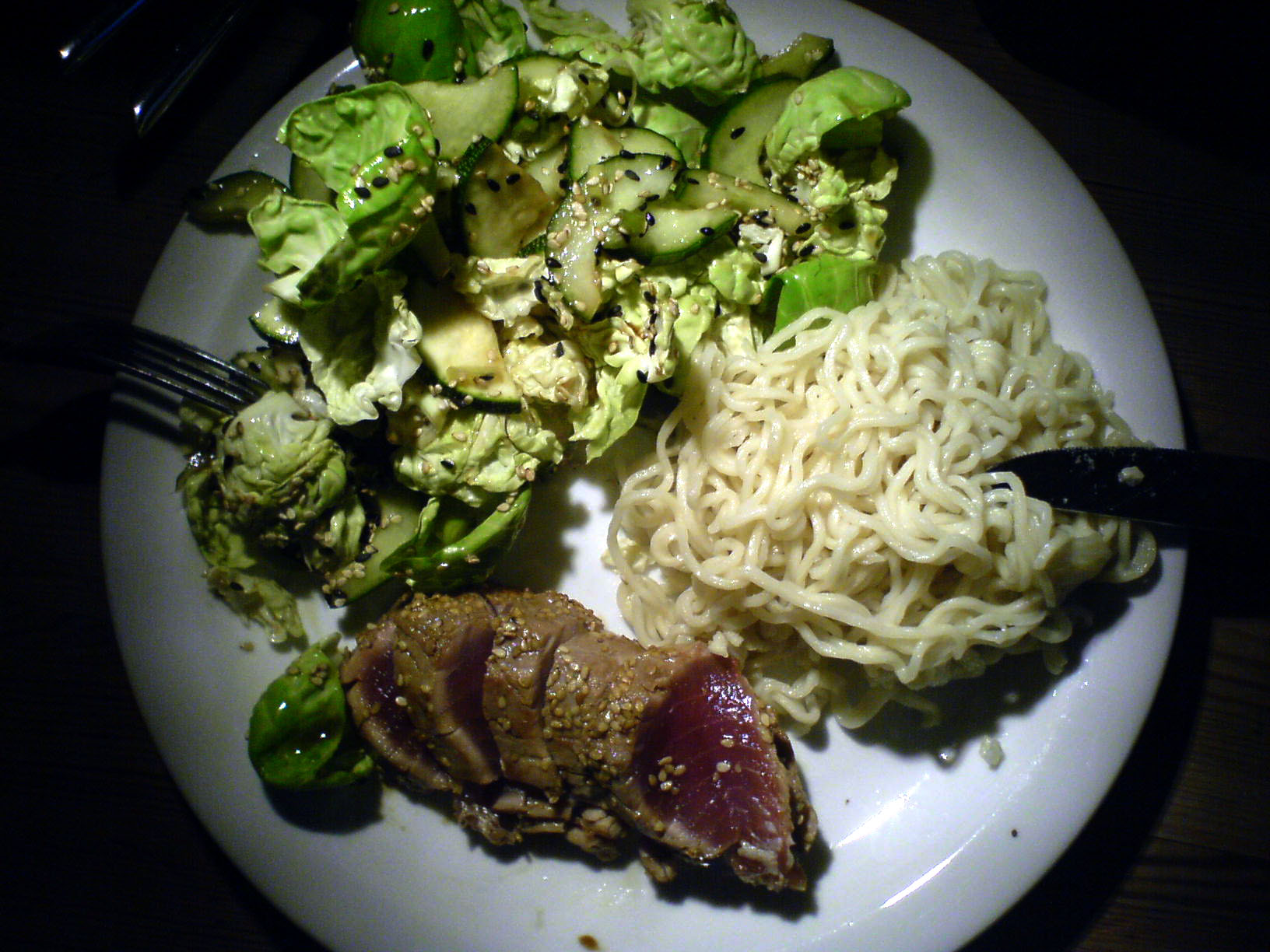
An example of a balanced meal: Half the plate is filled with high-fiber vegetables, and the rest is divided between tuna fish and noodles.

Reactive hypoglycemia can usually be relieved by dietary changes:

- Avoiding or limiting sugar intake, including candy, sweet desserts, fruit juice, and drinks with added sugar.
- Eating only small amounts of starchy foods, including potatoes, pasta, breakfast cereals, and rice.
- Eating a variety of foods, including:
  - eggs, nuts, dairy products, tofu, beans, lentils, meat, poultry, fish, or other sources of protein with every meal or snack,
  - whole-grain carbohydrates, such as eating whole wheat bread instead of white bread, and
  - more fruits and vegetables (but not fruit juice), with 5 A Day being a recommended goal for most people.
- Eating more high-fiber foods, such as lentils, beans, pulses (legumes), leafy greens, and most fruits and vegetables.

Other tips to prevent sugar crashes include:

- Exercising regularly, as exercise increases cellular sugar uptake, which decreases excessive insulin release.
- Avoiding eating meals or snacks composed entirely of carbohydrates; simultaneously ingest fats and proteins, which have slower rates of absorption;
- Consistently choosing longer lasting, complex carbohydrates to prevent rapid blood-sugar dips in the event that one does consume a disproportionately large amount of carbohydrates with a meal;
- Monitoring any effects medication may have on symptoms.

Low-carbohydrate diet and/or frequent small meals is the first treatment of this condition. The first important point is to add small meals at the middle of the morning and of the afternoon, when glycemia would start to decrease. If adequate composition of the meal is found, the fall in blood glucose is thus prevented. Patients should avoid rapidly absorbed sugars and thus avoid popular soft drinks rich in glucose or sucrose. They should also be cautious with drinks associating sugar and alcohol, mainly in the fasting state.

As it is a short-term ailment, a sugar crash that was not caused by injecting too much insulin does not usually require medical intervention in most people. The most important factors to consider when addressing this issue are the composition and timing of foods.

Acute (short-term) low blood sugar symptoms are best treated by consuming small amounts of sweet foods, so as to regain balance in the body's carbohydrate metabolism. Suggestions include sugary foods that are quickly digested, such as:

- Dried fruit
- Soft drinks
- Juice
- Sugar as sweets, tablets or cubes.

The anti-hypertensive class of medication known as calcium channel blockers could be useful for reactive hypoglycemia as inhibition of the calcium channels on beta islet cells can help prevent an overproduction of insulin after a meal is eaten.

== Postprandial syndrome ==
If there is no hypoglycemia at the time of the symptoms, this condition is called idiopathic postprandial syndrome. It might be an "adrenergic postprandial syndrome" — blood glucose levels are normal, but the symptoms are caused through autonomic adrenergic counterregulation. Often, this syndrome is associated with emotional distress and anxious behaviour of the patient. This is often seen in dysautonomic disorders as well. Dietary recommendations for reactive hypoglycemia can help to relieve symptoms of postprandial syndrome.

== See also ==
- Spontaneous hypoglycemia
- Refeeding syndrome
