= Glucose-elevating agent =

Medications used to treat hypoglycemia

Glucose-elevating agents are medications used to treat hypoglycemia (low blood sugar) by raising blood glucose. In diabetics, hypoglycemia can occur as a result of too much insulin or antidiabetic medication, insufficient food intake, or sudden increase in physical activity or exercise. The most common glucose-elevating agents used to treat diabetic hypoglycemia are glucose (in the form of tablets or liquid) and glucagon injections when severe hypoglycemia occurs. Diazoxide, which is used to counter hypoglycemia in disease states such as insulinoma (a tumor producing insulin) or congenital hyperinsulinism, increases blood glucose and decreases insulin secretion and glucagon accelerates breakdown of glycogen in the liver (glycogenolysis) to release glucose into the bloodstream.

== List of glucose-elevating agents ==
- Glucose (dextrose)
- Glucagon
- Diazoxide
