= Metastatic insulinoma =

Rare form of a malignant insulinoma involving metastatic growth

A metastatic insulinoma is a rare form of a malignant insulinoma involving metastatic growth. An insulinoma is a small tumor localized to the pancreas, originating from islet beta cells, which produce an excess of insulin. The increase in insulin ultimately leads to hypoglycemia. Insulinomas are commonly benign tumors, but can metastasize and become malignant. The metastatic growth can be characterized as a local invasion or distal metastasis. However, insulinomas are often difficult to detect due to their relatively small size, with a diameter oftentimes less than 2 cm. Therefore, clinical appearance and pathology are not sufficient in diagnosing a malignant insulinoma. Malignant insulinomas are not easily treated, as they require various treatments dependent on each person's case.

== Signs and symptoms ==
Metastatic insulinomas are commonly preceded by hypoglycemic symptoms and the Whipple triad. Majority of the hypoglycemic symptoms will manifest as neuroglycopenic symptoms and/or autonomic symptoms. Common neuroglycopenic symptoms include: generalized confusion, significant behavioral changes, coma, and seizure. Common autonomic symptoms include: diaphoresis, weakness, palpitations, and hunger. Thus, there are various presenting symptoms observed in patients. This is primarily attributed to the fact that metastatic insulinoma is initially diagnosed as another disease, such as benign insulinoma, which has the potential to progress and metastasize.

== Cause ==
Insulinomas generally occur sporadically. To date, the current cause of metastatic insulinomas is unknown. This is primarily due to their form as an already rare disease, insulinoma. Metastatic insulinomas are even less prevalent than insulinomas, and commonly begin as benign insulinomas which metastasize into metastastic insulinoma.

== Mechanisms ==
Patients with an insulinoma initially exhibit symptoms of hypoglycemia resulting from excess insulin secretion from the islet beta cells within the pancreatic tumor or from non-pancreatic tumor cells. The excess insulin secretes into the blood stream and causes a significant drop in the blood glucose level, also known as hypoglycemia. Hypoglycemia is accompanied by many of the above listed neuroglycopenic and/or autonomic symptoms. In metastatic insulinoma, cancerous cells from the initial insulinoma begin to break away and enter into either the bloodstream or the lymphatic system. Upon spreading and entering another part of the body, the process of metastasis has successfully occurred. The cancerous cells can now more rapidly divide and further spread. The main sites of metastasis for pancreatic cancer are the: liver, lung and peritoneum.

== Diagnosis ==
Diagnosis can occur via two distinct ways. The first is inclusive of a patient initially diagnosed with benign insulinoma. After the initial presentation of hypoglycemic symptoms, blood tests are taken in order to confirm hypoglycemia. A glucose, insulin and C-peptide are drawn. Initial diagnoses routinely also include a pre-operative CT to confirm an insulinoma. Upon completion of bloodwork and required radiology, majority of metastatic insulinomas are diagnosed if present. The most common treatment option for those diagnosed with benign insulinomas are treated by isolated removal of the insulinoma. But, some of these patient cases progress and metastasize into a metastatic insulinoma. This occurs when cancerous cells break away from the insulinoma and enter the bloodstream or lymphatic system. Thus, it is possible to later develop malignancy after the initial diagnosis of insulinoma, and even after operative removal of the insulinoma. In these cases, the most common site of metastases is the liver, as well as the lymph nodes. However, the second type of diagnoses of metastatic insulinoma involves a patient who presents with symptoms of an insulinoma, and is taken for a pre-operative CT.

=== Blood tests ===
The following blood tests are needed to diagnose insulinoma:

- Glucose
- Insulin
- C-peptide

A significant blood glucose level < 3 mmol/L insulin level > 3 μIU/mL, and C-peptide level > 0.6 ng/mL is indicative of hypoinsulinemic hypoglycemia.

=== Diagnostic Imaging ===
Less invasive imaging such as US, CT scan and MRI can be utilized to confirm the presence of an insulinoma. More specifically, a transabdominal ultrasound and CT are typically the first diagnostic images ordered. Further testing includes an endoscopic ultrasound or MRI.

== Treatment ==
Patients who are diagnosed with general insulinoma are commonly treated with surgical removal of the insulinoma. But, in those patients with metastatic insulinoma surgery is not enough. Thus, medical therapies are widely considered and reserved for those especially with unresectable insulinoma.

- Cytoreductive surgery
- Diazoxide & Thiazide Diuretics
- Beta-Blockers

Cytoreductive surgery, alongside other anti-tumor therapies are part of the initial treatment plans utilized for potential removal of the insulinoma. But, in patients with metastatic insulinoma, cytoreductive surgery has an effective rate of less than 10%. The surgery has however been shown to improve symptomatology and overall survival rate.

Diazoxide is a medication used to primarily reduce the excess insulin secreted from the insulinoma cells. Insulin is suppressed by affecting the ATP-sensitive potassium channels. This can also lead to an excess of potassium and ultimately result in oedema from sodium retention in the body. In order to counteract this, Diazoxide is commonly used in combination with thiazide diuretics. Although Diazoxide has been noted to have an immediate effect on patients, over the course of time the dosage may need to be increased.

Beta-blockers also have a positive effect in the overall reduction of insulin production. Therefore, resolving hypoglycemia.

== Prognosis ==
The prognosis once diagnosed with metastatic insulinoma falls on a large spectrum. Patients can live anywhere from 5 months to 29 years after initial diagnosis. The reason there is such a huge gap in the perspective life expectancy, is related to the minimal follow up information gathered on patients with metastatic insulinoma. Therefore, there is currently no reliable information regarding hard statistics or exact time intervals.

== Epidemiology ==
Because of the extremely rare prevalence of this disease, there is not much information available regarding the epidemiology. General insulinoma is diagnosed in every one to four cases per one million people. Malignant insulinoma is an extremely rare form of an insulinoma, affecting only about 10% of the total insulinoma cases. Insulinomas tend to have a slightly higher prevalence in females, at about 59% of the total diagnosed general insulinoma cases and occur at a median age of about 47.

== Research ==
The minimal research that has been completed on metastatic insulinoma addresses specific patient cases and presenting signs and symptoms. Potential treatment options are also commonly discussed within these case studies. But, the research to date is not comprehensive and cannot be generalized to all patients diagnosed with metastatic insulinoma. Therefore, I recommend further research be conducted into potential treatment for all cases of metastatic insulinoma. I would also recommend greater follow up with patients to provide a concrete life expectancy interval.
