= Dasiglucagon =

Medication

Clinical data
- Trade names: Zegalogue
- AHFS/Drugs.com: Monograph
- MedlinePlus: a621022
- License data: US DailyMed: Dasiglucagon
- Routes of administration: Subcutaneous
- Drug class: Glucagon receptor agonist
- ATC code: H04AA02 (WHO)

Legal status
- Legal status: US: ℞-only; EU: Rx-only

Identifiers
- IUPAC name: (4S)-4-[[(2S)-2-[[(2S)-2-[[(2S)-2-[[2-[[(2S)-2-[[(2S)-2-[[(2S)-2-[[(2S)-6-amino-2-[[(2S)-2-[[(2S)-2-[[(2S)-2-[[(2S)-2-[[(2S,3R)-2-[[(2S)-2-[[(2S,3R)-2-[[2-[[(2S)-5-amino-2-[[(2S)-2-[[(2S)-2-amino-3-(1H-imidazol-4-yl)propanoyl]amino]-3-hydroxypropanoyl]amino]-5-oxopentanoyl]amino]acetyl]amino]-3-hydroxybutanoyl]amino]-3-phenylpropanoyl]amino]-3-hydroxybutanoyl]amino]-3-hydroxypropanoyl]amino]-3-carboxypropanoyl]amino]-3-(4-hydroxyphenyl)propanoyl]amino]-3-hydroxypropanoyl]amino]hexanoyl]amino]-3-(4-hydroxyphenyl)propanoyl]amino]-4-methylpentanoyl]amino]-3-carboxypropanoyl]amino]-2-methylpropanoyl]amino]propanoyl]amino]-5-carbamimidamidopentanoyl]amino]propanoyl]amino]-5-[[(2S)-1-[[(2S)-1-[[(2S)-1-[[(2S)-6-amino-1-[[(2S)-1-[[(2S)-1-[[(2S)-4-carboxy-1-[[(2S)-1-[[(1S,2R)-1-carboxy-2-hydroxypropyl]amino]-3-hydroxy-1-oxopropan-2-yl]amino]-1-oxobutan-2-yl]amino]-4-methyl-1-oxopentan-2-yl]amino]-3-(1H-indol-3-yl)-1-oxopropan-2-yl]amino]-1-oxohexan-2-yl]amino]-3-methyl-1-oxobutan-2-yl]amino]-1-oxo-3-phenylpropan-2-yl]amino]-4-carboxy-1-oxobutan-2-yl]amino]-5-oxopentanoic acid
- CAS Number: 1544300-84-6
- PubChem CID: 126961379
- DrugBank: DB15226
- ChemSpider: 114936237
- UNII: AD4J2O47FQ
- KEGG: D11359; D12314
- CompTox Dashboard (EPA): DTXSID501336774

Chemical and physical data
- Formula: C_{152}H_{222}N_{38}O_{50}
- Molar mass: 3381.664 g·mol^{−1}
- 3D model (JSmol): Interactive image
- SMILES: C[C@H]([C@@H](C(=O)N[C@@H](CC1=CC=CC=C1)C(=O)N[C@@H]([C@@H](C)O)C(=O)N[C@@H](CO)C(=O)N[C@@H](CC(=O)O)C(=O)N[C@@H](CC2=CC=C(C=C2)O)C(=O)N[C@@H](CO)C(=O)N[C@@H](CCCCN)C(=O)N[C@@H](CC3=CC=C(C=C3)O)C(=O)N[C@@H](CC(C)C)C(=O)N[C@@H](CC(=O)O)C(=O)NC(C)(C)C(=O)N[C@@H](C)C(=O)N[C@@H](CCCNC(=N)N)C(=O)N[C@@H](C)C(=O)N[C@@H](CCC(=O)O)C(=O)N[C@@H](CCC(=O)O)C(=O)N[C@@H](CC4=CC=CC=C4)C(=O)N[C@@H](C(C)C)C(=O)N[C@@H](CCCCN)C(=O)N[C@@H](CC5=CNC6=CC=CC=C65)C(=O)N[C@@H](CC(C)C)C(=O)N[C@@H](CCC(=O)O)C(=O)N[C@@H](CO)C(=O)N[C@@H]([C@@H](C)O)C(=O)O)NC(=O)CNC(=O)[C@H](CCC(=O)N)NC(=O)[C@H](CO)NC(=O)[C@H](CC7=CNC=N7)N)O
- InChI: InChI=1S/C152H222N38O50/c1-73(2)55-99(133(222)171-98(47-51-116(206)207)132(221)183-111(71-194)144(233)189-122(80(11)197)149(238)239)174-137(226)105(61-85-65-161-91-32-21-20-31-89(85)91)178-129(218)93(34-23-25-53-154)172-146(235)119(75(5)6)187-139(228)103(57-81-27-16-14-17-28-81)176-131(220)97(46-50-115(204)205)170-130(219)96(45-49-114(202)203)167-123(212)76(7)164-127(216)94(35-26-54-160-151(157)158)166-124(213)77(8)165-150(240)152(12,13)190-145(234)107(64-118(210)211)180-134(223)100(56-74(3)4)173-135(224)101(59-83-36-40-87(198)41-37-83)175-128(217)92(33-22-24-52-153)168-142(231)109(69-192)184-136(225)102(60-84-38-42-88(199)43-39-84)177-138(227)106(63-117(208)209)179-143(232)110(70-193)185-148(237)121(79(10)196)188-140(229)104(58-82-29-18-15-19-30-82)181-147(236)120(78(9)195)186-113(201)67-162-126(215)95(44-48-112(156)200)169-141(230)108(68-191)182-125(214)90(155)62-86-66-159-72-163-86/h14-21,27-32,36-43,65-66,72-80,90,92-111,119-122,161,191-199H,22-26,33-35,44-64,67-71,153-155H2,1-13H3,(H2,156,200)(H,159,163)(H,162,215)(H,164,216)(H,165,240)(H,166,213)(H,167,212)(H,168,231)(H,169,230)(H,170,219)(H,171,222)(H,172,235)(H,173,224)(H,174,226)(H,175,217)(H,176,220)(H,177,227)(H,178,218)(H,179,232)(H,180,223)(H,181,236)(H,182,214)(H,183,221)(H,184,225)(H,185,237)(H,186,201)(H,187,228)(H,188,229)(H,189,233)(H,190,234)(H,202,203)(H,204,205)(H,206,207)(H,208,209)(H,210,211)(H,238,239)(H4,157,158,160)/t76-,77-,78+,79+,80+,90-,92-,93-,94-,95-,96-,97-,98-,99-,100-,101-,102-,103-,104-,105-,106-,107-,108-,109-,110-,111-,119-,120-,121-,122-/m0/s1; Key:RZRMFQMNPDPAIX-AJTOSFMRSA-N

Dasiglucagon, sold under the brand name Zegalogue, is a medication used to treat severe hypoglycemia in people with diabetes.

The most common side effects include nausea, vomiting, headache, diarrhea, and injection site pain.

Dasiglucagon was approved for medical use in the United States in March 2021.

== Medical uses ==
Dasiglucagon is indicated for the treatment of severe hypoglycemia in people aged six years of age and older with diabetes.

== Contraindications ==
Dasiglucagon is contraindicated in people with pheochromocytoma or insulinoma.

== Pharmacology ==
=== Mechanism of action ===
Dasiglucagon operates through the same mechanism as endogenous glucagon, acting as an agonist at glucagon receptors expressed throughout the body, which are G-coupled receptors. Binding to liver glucagon receptors, dasiglucagon activates Gsα and Gq, resulting in the activation of adenylate cyclase. This, in turn, increases intracellular cyclic AMP levels, stimulating glycogenolysis and gluconeogenesis in the liver. As glucose is primarily released from liver glycogen stores, the presence of glycogen stores in the liver is essential for dasiglucagon to exert its antihypoglycemic effects

=== Pharmacodynamics ===
Dasiglucagon elevates blood glucose levels in normal and hypoglycemic conditions. In adult patients with type 1 diabetes, the average increase in glucose levels at 90 minutes after dasiglucagon administration was 168 mg/dL. For pediatric patients aged seven to 17 years with type 1 diabetes, the mean glucose increase at 60 minutes post-administration was 162 mg/dL. A study conducted on Danish patients with type 1 diabetes (T1DM) compared the pharmacological effects of dasiglucagon with glucagon. Dasiglucagon reached its maximum plasma concentration later than glucagon (35 minutes vs. 20 minutes) across different doses. The time for patients to recover glycemic levels above 70 mg/dL was similar between dasiglucagon (≥0.3 mg) and glucagon (0.5 mg and 1 mg) groups. Dasiglucagon rapidly increased plasma glucose (PG) levels in a dose-dependent manner, reaching a maximum concentration in approximately 50-90 minutes. The glycokinetic response of dasiglucagon was 2-4 times higher than that of glucagon. Dasiglucagon had a higher overall effect than GlucaGen at certain dose levels. In children with T1DM (7 to 17 years old), dasiglucagon showed a faster increase in blood glucose levels by 160 mg/dL or more from baseline at an earlier time (about 30 min) than in adults. Due to the limited number of patients aged 65 years and older enrolled in phase 3 trials, it was impossible to determine if these patients' responses differed from those of young adults. Dasiglucagon demonstrates pharmacological effects consistent with glucagon, except for the freezing deficiency observed in rats (specific to rats and occurring simultaneously with glucagon and dasiglucagon) and the accumulation of liver glycogen in non-diabetic animals with obvious hyperglycemia and hyperinsulinemia.

=== Pharmacokinetics ===
Dasiglucagon rapidly enters the bloodstream upon administration, resulting in a dose-dependent increase in plasma levels within approximately 15 minutes. The maximum concentration of dasiglucagon in the bloodstream is typically attained around 35 minutes after administration, with a half-life (t1/2) of approximately 0.5 hours. Following the time to maximum concentration (t_{max}), dasiglucagon demonstrates a decline in concentration over a span of approximately 0.4-0.7 hours, as compared to glucagon's t1/2 of 0.25 hours. Consequently, dasiglucagon exhibits significantly greater values for area under the curve (AUC) measurements, such as AUC_{0-inf}, AUC_{0-30 min}, AUC_{0-240 min}, and maximum concentration (C_{max}), when administered under euglycemic conditions. These values are approximately 1.4-4 times higher than those observed with glucagon. Comparative analysis with the medication GlucaGen® (glucagon for injection 1mg/mL) reveals that dasiglucagon demonstrates more prolonged plasma exposure and higher total drug exposure (AUC_{0-inf}). Therapeutic ratios for dasiglucagon doses of 0.6 mg and 0.3 mg, in relation to GlucaGen® doses of 1.0 mg and 0.5 mg, respectively, indicate superior effects on AUC_{0-inf, BL} (1.59 and 1.46). In contrast, the effects on C_{max,BL} are similar (1.03 and 0.91). However, it is worth noting that the upper limit of the 95% confidence interval (CI) for C_{max} and AUC_{0-30 min} is slightly lower than 1, potentially due to higher early plasma exposure per milligram observed in the lower-dose group compared to the higher-dose group. In clinical trials (NCT03216226), dasiglucagon showed a similar safety profile to reconstituted glucagon. No serious adverse events or deaths were reported. The most common side effects were nausea and vomiting. In terms of efficacy, dasiglucagon was as effective as reconstituted glucagon in reversing severe hypoglycemia induced by insulin, with a median recovery time of 10 minutes compared to 12 minutes for reconstituted glucagon. The recovery time was significantly shorter compared to the placebo group (median 40 minutes).

== Interactions ==
Dasiglucagon may cause temporary increases in blood pressure and pulse when taken concurrently with beta blockers. When taken with indomethacin, dasiglucagon may lose its effectiveness in increasing blood sugar levels and potentially lead to hypoglycemia. Additionally, dasiglucagon has the potential to enhance the anticoagulant effect of warfarin.

== History ==
A phase III trial for dasiglucagon was started in July 2017. In December 2017, Zealand (Copenhagen, Denmark) announced the initiation of a phase III trial for dasiglucagon, with the intention of submitting positive outcomes to the US Food and Drug Administration (FDA) in 2019.

The FDA approved dasiglucagon based on evidence from two clinical trials conducted in adults with type 1 diabetes (169 participants) and one clinical trial conducted in pediatric participants older than six years with type 1 diabetes (31 participants). The trials were conducted in the following five countries: United States, Germany, Austria, Canada, and Slovenia. The same trials were used to assess the safety and efficacy of dasiglucagon: adult Trials A and B and pediatric Trial C. In all trials, participants were randomized into one of three groups: one group received dasiglucagon, one group received placebo, and one group received glucagon for injection (a similar drug that is FDA approved for the same purpose as dasiglucagon). In all groups, participants were given insulin to decrease their blood sugar to a low level (hypoglycemia). Subjects received a single injection of either dasiglucagon, placebo, or glucagon for injection, and the ability of the treatment to increase the participants' blood sugar was evaluated.

== Society and culture ==
=== Legal status ===
Dasiglucagon was designated an orphan drug by the FDA in August 2017.

In May 2024, the Committee for Medicinal Products for Human Use of the European Medicines Agency adopted a positive opinion, recommending the granting of a marketing authorization for the medicinal product Zegalogue, intended for the treatment of severe hypoglycaemia in people with diabetes. The applicant for this medicinal product is Zealand Pharma A/S. Dasiglucagon was approved for medical use in the European Union in July 2024.
