= Allen Whipple =

American surgeon

- Born: September 2, 1881
- Died: April 6, 1963 (aged 81)
- Education: Princeton University; Columbia University
- Occupation: Surgeon

Allen Oldfather Whipple (September 2, 1881 – April 6, 1963) was an American surgeon who is known for the pancreatic cancer operation which bears his name (the Whipple procedure) as well as Whipple's triad.

== Early life and education ==
Whipple was born to missionary parents William Levi Whipple and Mary Louise Whipple (née Allen), in Urmia, West Azerbaijan, Iran. He attended Princeton University and received his M.D. from Columbia University College of Physicians and Surgeons in 1908, and was licensed to practice medicine in the state of New York on February 4, 1910.

== Career ==
Whipple became a professor of surgery at Columbia University and Columbia-Presbyterian Medical Center where he served from 1921 to 1946. He began work on the procedure for resection of the pancreas (pancreaticoduodenectomy) in 1935 and his original technique has since been modified greatly. In 1940, he shortened the procedure into a one-stage process. During his lifetime, Whipple performed 37 pancreaticoduodenectomies.

He also is known for developing the diagnostic triad for insulinoma known as Whipple's triad.

He supervised the surgical residency of Virginia Apgar, later advising her to pursue her medical career in the field of anaesthesiology because he knew that surgery depended on advancements in this field to progress, and he saw in Apgar the 'energy and ability' to make a significant contribution. Apgar later devised the Apgar Score also at Columbia-Presbyterian Medical Center, by which the health of newborns is evaluated to this day.

Whipple was instrumental in founding the American Board of Surgery. He also was trustee of Princeton University and was a recipient of the 1958 Woodrow Wilson Award.

Though he is not related to George Hoyt Whipple — who named Whipple's disease and discovered Tropheryma whipplei — the two were lifelong friends.

The Science Building at Wooster School in Danbury, Connecticut, is named after Whipple, who served as President of Wooster's Board of Trustees when the school's founder, Rev. Aaron Coburn, died. In the later years of his life he lived in Show Low, Arizona.

== Sources ==
- Whipple AO. Observations on radical surgery for lesions of the pancreas. Surg Gyn Obst 1946;82:62.
- Whipple Website: Allen Oldfather Whipple
- The Whipple Procedure, by John A. Chabot, M.D.
- Wooster Chronology – Wooster School
