= PHKG1 =

Protein-coding gene in the species Homo sapiens

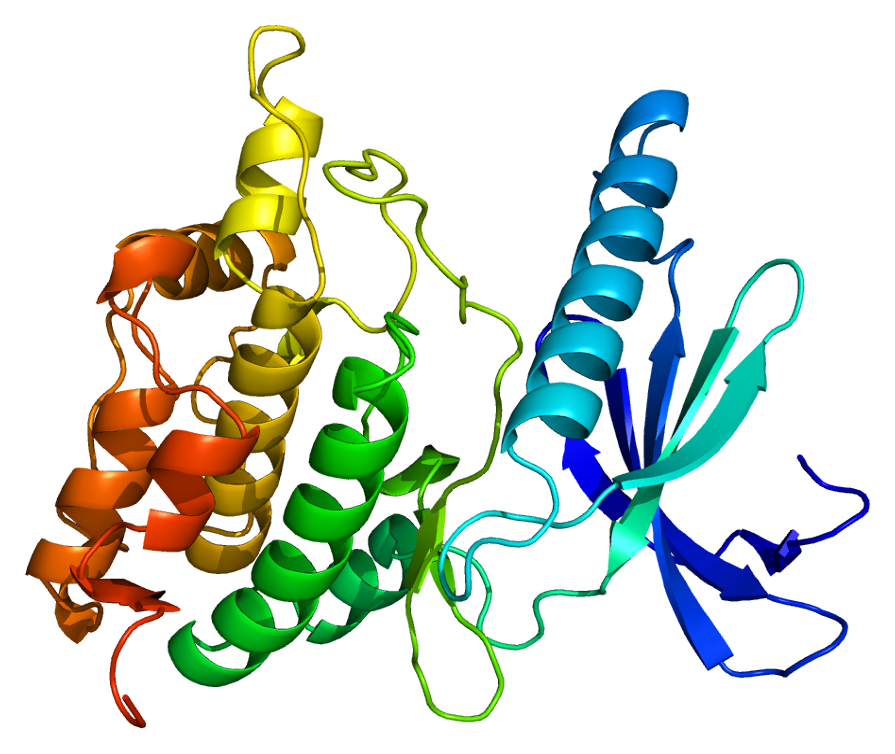

Identifiers
- Aliases: PHKG1, PHKG, phosphorylase kinase catalytic subunit gamma 1
- External IDs: OMIM: 172470; MGI: 97579; HomoloGene: 68508; GeneCards: PHKG1; OMA:PHKG1 - orthologs
- EC number: 2.7.11.26

Gene location (Human)
Chr.	Chromosome 7 (human)
Band	7p11.2	Start	56,080,283 bp
Band	7p11.2	End	56,092,996 bp

Gene location (Mouse)
Chr.	Chromosome 5 (mouse)
Band	5 G1.3|5 68.26 cM	Start	129,892,262 bp
Band	5 G1.3|5 68.26 cM	End	129,927,390 bp
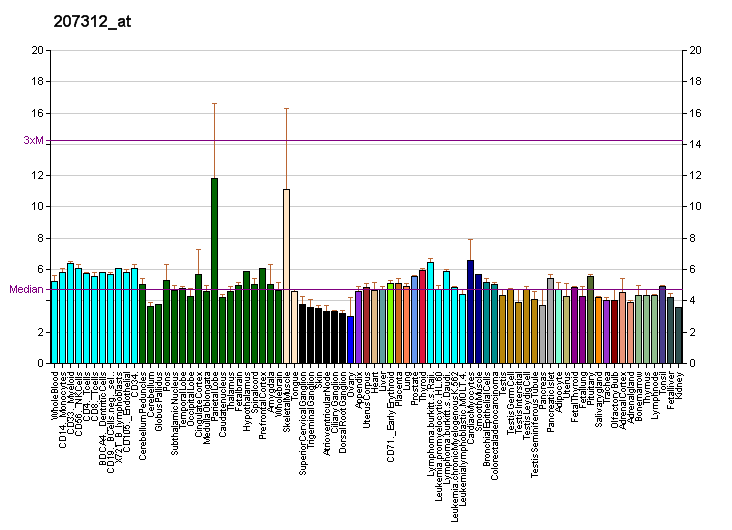
RNA expression pattern
Bgee	Human / Mouse (ortholog); Top expressed in: gastrocnemius muscle; muscle of thigh; triceps brachii muscle; Skeletal muscle tissue of rectus abdominis; biceps brachii; glutes; Skeletal muscle tissue of biceps brachii; apex of heart; quadriceps femoris muscle; vastus lateralis muscle / Top expressed in: muscle of thigh; extensor digitorum longus muscle; triceps brachii muscle; gastrocnemius muscle; masseter muscle; medial head of gastrocnemius muscle; tibialis anterior muscle; vastus lateralis muscle; sternocleidomastoid muscle; temporal muscle; More reference expression data
BioGPS	More reference expression data
Gene ontology
Molecular function	enzyme binding; nucleotide binding; protein kinase activity; protein serine/threonine kinase activity; transferase activity; tau-protein kinase activity; ATP binding; calmodulin binding; kinase activity; phosphorylase kinase activity; calmodulin-dependent protein kinase activity
Cellular component	cytosol; phosphorylase kinase complex
Biological process	protein phosphorylation; glycogen biosynthetic process; phosphorylation; glycogen metabolic process; peptidyl-serine phosphorylation; peptidyl-threonine phosphorylation; intracellular signal transduction; carbohydrate metabolic process; glycogen catabolic process
Sources:Amigo / QuickGO
Orthologs
Species	Human	Mouse
Entrez	5260	18682
Ensembl	ENSG00000164776	ENSMUSG00000025537
UniProt	Q16816	P07934
RefSeq (mRNA)	NM_001258459; NM_001258460; NM_006213	NM_011079
RefSeq (protein)	NP_001245388; NP_001245389; NP_006204	NP_035209
Location (UCSC)	Chr 7: 56.08 – 56.09 Mb	Chr 5: 129.89 – 129.93 Mb
PubMed search
- Wikidata
View/Edit Human	View/Edit Mouse

Phosphorylase b kinase gamma catalytic chain, skeletal muscle isoform is an enzyme that in humans is encoded by the PHKG1 gene.

This gene is a member of the Ser/Thr protein kinase family and encodes a protein with one protein kinase domain and two calmodulin-binding domains. This protein is the catalytic member of a 16 subunit protein kinase complex which contains equimolar ratios of 4 subunit types. The complex is a crucial glycogenolytic regulatory enzyme. This gene has two pseudogenes at chromosome 7q11.21 and one at chromosome 11p11.12.
