= ATC code H04 =

Drug classification – pancreatic hormones

ATC code H04 Pancreatic hormones is a therapeutic subgroup of the Anatomical Therapeutic Chemical Classification System, a system of alphanumeric codes developed by the World Health Organization (WHO) for the classification of drugs and other medical products. Subgroup H04 is part of the anatomical group H Systemic hormonal preparations, excluding sex hormones and insulins.

Codes for veterinary use (ATCvet codes) can be created by placing the letter Q in front of the human ATC code: for example, QH04.
National versions of the ATC classification may include additional codes not present in this list, which follows the WHO version.

== H04A Glycogenolytic hormones ==
=== H04AA Glycogenolytic hormones ===
H04AA01 Glucagon
H04AA02 Dasiglucagon
