= Whipple's triad =

Collection of three signs that suggest hypoglycaemia caused by insulinoma

- Other names: Whipple's criteria
- Symptoms: symptoms of hypoglycaemia, low blood plasma glucose concentration, relief of symptoms when plasma glucose concentration increased
- Differential diagnosis: hypoglycemia

Whipple's triad is a collection of three signs (called Whipple's criteria) that suggests that a patient's symptoms result from hypoglycaemia that may indicate insulinoma. The essential conditions are symptoms of hypoglycaemia, low blood plasma glucose concentration, and relief of symptoms when plasma glucose concentration is increased. It was first described by the pancreatic surgeon Allen Whipple, who aimed to establish criteria for exploratory pancreatic surgery to look for insulinoma.

== Definition ==
Whipple's triad is stated in various versions. The essential conditions are:

1. Symptoms known or likely to be caused by hypoglycaemia, especially after fasting or intense exercise. These symptoms include tremor, tachycardia, anxiety, dizziness, and loss of consciousness.
2. A low blood plasma glucose concentration measured at the time of the symptoms. This may be measured as a blood plasma glucose concentration of less than 55 milligrams per deciliter (3.1 mmol/L).
3. Relief of symptoms when glucose level is increased.

The use and significance of the criteria have evolved over the last century as understanding of the many forms of hypoglycaemia has increased and diagnostic tests and imaging procedures have improved. Whipple's criteria are no longer used to justify surgical exploration for an insulinoma, but to separate "true hypoglycaemia" (in which a low glucose can be demonstrated) from a variety of other conditions (e.g., idiopathic postprandial syndrome) in which symptoms suggestive of hypoglycaemia occur, but low glucose levels cannot be demonstrated. The criteria are now invoked far more often by endocrinologists than by surgeons. The radiological investigation of choice now is endoscopic and/or intraoperative ultrasonography.

== Differential diagnosis ==
Whipple's triad is not exclusive for insulinoma, and other conditions will also be considered. The same signs may be caused by hyperinsulinism not caused by insulinoma.

== History ==
The criteria date back to the 1930s, when a few patients with hypoglycaemic symptoms (such as shakiness, syncope, or sweating) due to hypoglycaemia were found to be cured by surgery to remove an insulinoma, but a large proportion of people with symptoms suggestive of hypoglycaemia apparently had no need of surgery. Diagnostic testing was rudimentary; beyond a crude assay for reducing substances as an indirect measure of blood glucose, no way had yet been found to measure hormones and metabolites such as insulin, with no imaging procedures for internal organs such as the pancreas.

Allen Whipple was a well-known surgeon who had pioneered pancreatic surgery. He proposed that no pancreatic surgery to look for insulinoma be performed unless these criteria were met. For this reason, Whipple's triad is also known as Whipple's criteria.

== See also ==
- Hyperinsulinism
- Hypoglycemia
- Causes of hypoglycemia
