= Dipeptidyl-peptidase IV family =

Dipeptidyl peptidase IV (DPP IV) N-terminal region
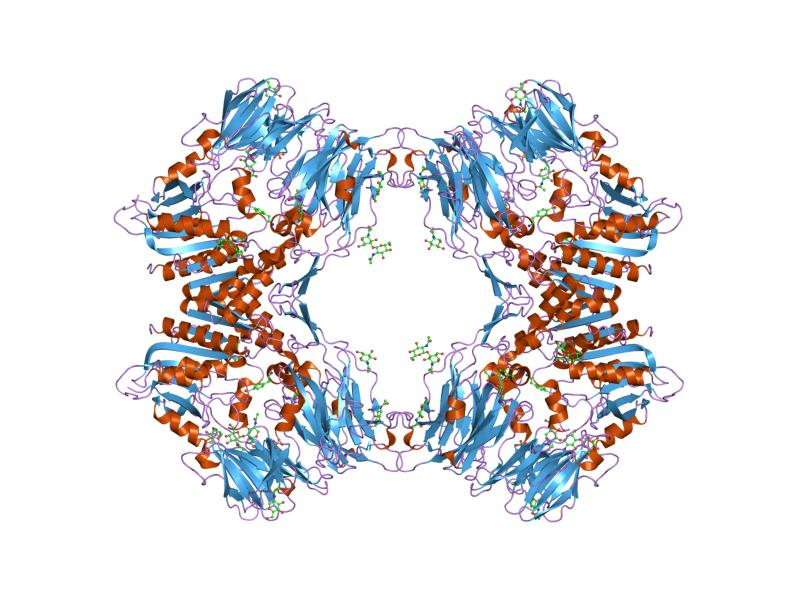
- porcine dipeptidyl peptidase iv (cd26) in complex with 4-(2-aminoethyl)-benzene sulphonyl fluoride (aebsf)

Identifiers
- Symbol: DPPIV_N
- Pfam: PF00930
- Pfam clan: CL0186
- InterPro: IPR002469
- PROSITE: PDOC00587
- MEROPS: S9
- SCOP2: 1n1m / SCOPe / SUPFAM
- Membranome: 321
Available protein structures:
- PDB: IPR002469 PF00930 (ECOD; PDBsum)
- AlphaFold: IPR002469; PF00930

In molecular biology, the dipeptidyl-peptidase IV family is a family of serine peptidases which belong to MEROPS peptidase family S9 (clan SC), subfamily S9B (dipeptidyl-peptidase IV). The protein fold of the peptidase domain for members of this family resembles that of serine carboxypeptidase D, the type example of clan SC. The type example of this family is Dipeptidyl peptidase-4.

Human proteins in this family are:

- Dipeptidyl peptidase-4
- Dipeptidyl peptidase 8
- Dipeptidyl peptidase 9
- Inactive dipeptidyl peptidase 10
- Dipeptidyl aminopeptidase-like protein 6
- Seprase
