= Hypoglycemia =

Decrease in blood sugar

- Other names: Hypoglycaemia, hypoglycæmia, low blood glucose, low blood sugar
- Specialty: Endocrinology, emergency medicine
- Symptoms: Headache, blurred vision, shakiness, dizziness, weakness, fatigue, sweating, clamminess, fast heart rate, anxiety, hunger, nausea, pins and needles sensation, difficulty talking, confusion, unusual behavior, lightheadedness, pale skin color, seizures
- Complications: Loss of consciousness, death, cardiac arrest
- Usual onset: Rapid
- Causes: Medications (insulin, glinides, and sulfonylureas), sepsis, kidney failure, certain tumors, liver disease, malnutrition
- Diagnostic method: Whipple's triad: Symptoms of hypoglycemia, serum blood glucose level <70 mg/dL (3.9 mmol/L), and resolution of symptoms when blood glucose returns to normal
- Treatment: Eating foods high in simple sugars
- Medication: Glucose, glucagon
- Frequency: In type 1 diabetics, mild hypoglycemia occurs twice per week on average, and severe hypoglycemia occurs once per year.
- Deaths: In type 1 diabetics, 6–10% will die of hypoglycemia.

Hypoglycemia (American English), also spelled hypoglycaemia or hypoglycæmia (British English), sometimes called low blood sugar, is a fall in blood sugar to levels below normal, typically below 70 mg/dL (3.9 mmol/L). Whipple's triad is used to properly identify hypoglycemic episodes. It is defined as blood glucose below 70 mg/dL (3.9 mmol/L), symptoms associated with hypoglycemia, and resolution of symptoms when blood sugar returns to normal. Hypoglycemia may result in headache, tiredness, clumsiness, trouble talking, confusion, fast heart rate, sweating, shakiness, nervousness, hunger, loss of consciousness, seizures, or death. Symptoms typically come on quickly. Symptoms can persist after blood-glucose levels are restored to normal.

The most common cause of hypoglycemia is medications used to treat diabetes such as insulin, sulfonylureas, and biguanides. Risk is greater in people with diabetes who have eaten less than usual, recently exercised, or consumed alcohol. Other causes of hypoglycemia include severe illness, sepsis, kidney failure, liver disease, hormone deficiency, tumors such as insulinomas or non-B cell tumors, inborn errors of metabolism, and several medications. Low blood sugar may occur in otherwise healthy newborns who have not eaten for a few hours.

Hypoglycemia is treated by eating a sugary food or drink, for example glucose tablets or gel, apple juice, soft drinks, or lollipops. The person must be conscious and able to swallow. The goal is to consume 10–20 grams of a carbohydrate to raise blood glucose levels to a minimum of 70 mg/dL (3.9 mmol/L). If a person is not able to take food by mouth, glucagon by injection or insufflation may help. The treatment of hypoglycemia unrelated to diabetes includes treating the underlying problem.

Among people with diabetes, prevention starts with learning the signs and symptoms of hypoglycemia. Diabetes medications, like insulin, sulfonylureas, and biguanides can also be adjusted or stopped to prevent hypoglycemia. Frequent and routine blood glucose testing is recommended. Some may find continuous glucose monitors with insulin pumps to be helpful in the management of diabetes and prevention of hypoglycemia.

== Definition ==
Hypoglycemia, also called low blood sugar or low blood glucose, is a blood-sugar level below 70 mg/dL (3.9 mmol/L).

Blood-sugar levels fluctuate naturally throughout the day, with the body normally maintaining levels between 70 and 110 mg/dL (3.9–6.1 mmol/L). Although 70 mg/dL (3.9 mmol/L) is the lower limit of normal glucose, symptoms of hypoglycemia usually do not occur until blood sugar has fallen to 55 mg/dL (3.0 mmol/L) or lower. The blood-glucose level at which symptoms of hypoglycemia develop in someone with several prior episodes of hypoglycemia may be even lower.

=== Whipple's triad ===
The symptoms of low blood sugar alone are not specific enough to characterize a hypoglycemic episode. A single blood sugar reading below 70 mg/dL is also not specific enough to characterize a hypoglycemic episode. Whipple's triad is a set of three conditions that must be met to accurately characterize a hypoglycemic episode.

The three conditions are:

1. Signs and symptoms of hypoglycemia manifest (see Signs and Symptoms below)
2. Low blood glucose, less than 70 mg/dL (3.9 mmol/L)
3. The signs and symptoms of hypoglycemia resolve after blood glucose levels return to normal

=== Age ===
The biggest difference in blood glucose levels between the adult and pediatric population occurs in newborns during the first 48 hours of life. After the first 48 hours of life, the Pediatric Endocrine Society cites minimal difference in blood glucose level and the use of glucose between adults and children. During the 48-hour neonatal period, the neonate adjusts glucagon and epinephrine levels following birth, which may cause temporary hypoglycemia. As a result, there has been difficulty in developing guidelines on interpretation and treatment of low blood glucose in neonates aged less than 48 hours. Following a data review, the Pediatric Endocrine Society concluded that neonates aged less than 48 hours begin to respond to hypoglycemia at serum glucose levels of 55–65 mg/dL (3.0–3.6 mmol/L). This contrasts with the value in adults, children, and older infants of approximately 80–85 mg/dL (4.4–4.7 mmol/L).

In children aged greater than 48 hours, serum glucose on average ranges from 70 to 100 mg/dL (3.9–5.5 mmol/L), similar to adults. Elderly patients and patients who take diabetes pills such as sulfonylureas are more likely to suffer from a severe hypoglycemic episode. Whipple's triad is used to identify hypoglycemia in children who can communicate their symptoms.

== Signs and symptoms ==
Hypoglycemic symptoms are divided into two main categories. The first category is symptoms caused by low glucose in the brain, called neuroglycopenic symptoms. The second category of symptoms is caused by the body's reaction to low glucose in the blood, called adrenergic symptoms.

Neuroglycopenic symptoms	Adrenergic symptoms
Headache; Blurred vision; Fatigue; Unusual behavior; Confusion; Lightheadedness; Difficulty speaking or slurred speech; Seizures; Loss of consciousness; Death, if severe hypoglycemia	Fast heart rate; Pounding heartbeat (also called palpitations); Sweating; Clamminess; Tremors; Anxiety; Hunger; Irritability; Nausea; Pins and needles sensation; Pale skin color

Everyone experiences different symptoms of hypoglycemia, so someone with hypoglycemia may not have all of the symptoms listed above. Symptoms also tend to have quick onset. It is important to quickly obtain a blood glucose measurement in someone presenting with symptoms of hypoglycemia to properly identify the hypoglycemic episode.

== Causes ==
Hypoglycemia is most common in those with diabetes treated by insulin, glinides, and sulfonylureas. Hypoglycemia is rare in those without diabetes, because there are many regulatory mechanisms in place to appropriately balance glucose, insulin, and glucagon.

=== Diabetic ===
==== Medications ====
The most common cause of hypoglycemia in diabetics is medications used to treat diabetes such as insulin, sulfonylureas, and biguanides. This is often due to excessive doses or poorly timed doses. Sometimes diabetics may take insulin in anticipation of a meal or snack; then forgetting or missing eating that meal or snack can lead to hypoglycemia. This is due to increased insulin without the presence of glucose from the planned meal.

==== Hypoglycemic unawareness ====
Recurrent episodes of hypoglycemia can lead to hypoglycemic unawareness, or the decreased ability to recognize hypoglycemia. As diabetics experience more episodes of hypoglycemia, the blood glucose level which triggers symptoms of hypoglycemia decreases. In other words, people without hypoglycemic unawareness experience symptoms of hypoglycemia at a blood glucose of about 55 mg/dL (3.0 mmol/L). Those with hypoglycemic unawareness experience the symptoms of hypoglycemia at far lower levels of blood glucose. This is dangerous for a number of reasons. The hypoglycemic person not only gains awareness of hypoglycemia at very low blood glucose levels, but they also require high levels of carbohydrates or glucagon to recover their blood glucose to normal levels. These individuals are also at far greater risk of severe hypoglycemia.

While the exact cause of hypoglycemic unawareness is still under research, it is thought that these individuals progressively begin to develop fewer adrenergic-type symptoms, resulting in the loss of neuroglycopenic-type symptoms. Neuroglycopenic symptoms are caused by low glucose in the brain, and can result in tiredness, confusion, difficulty with speech, seizures, and loss of consciousness. Adrenergic symptoms are caused by the body's reaction to low glucose in the brain, and can result in fast heart rate, sweating, nervousness, and hunger. See section above on Signs and Symptoms for further explanation of neuroglycopenic symptoms and adrenergic symptoms.

In terms of epidemiology, hypoglycemic unawareness occurs in 20–40% of type 1 diabetics.

==== Other causes ====
Other causes of hypoglycemia in diabetics include the following:

- Fasting, whether it be a planned fast or overnight fast, as there is a long period of time without glucose intake
- Exercising more than usual as it leads to more use of glucose, especially by the muscles
- Drinking alcohol, especially when combined with diabetic medications, as alcohol inhibits glucose production
- Kidney disease, as insulin cannot be cleared out of circulation well

=== Non-diabetic ===
==== Serious illness ====
Serious illness may result in low blood sugar. Severe disease of many organ systems can cause hypoglycemia as a secondary problem. Hypoglycemia is especially common in those in the intensive care unit or those in whom food and drink is withheld as a part of their treatment plan.

Sepsis, a common cause of hypoglycemia in serious illness, can lead to hypoglycemia through many ways. In a state of sepsis, the body uses large amounts of glucose for energy. Glucose use is further increased by cytokine production. Cytokines are a protein produced by the body in a state of stress, particularly when fighting an infection. Cytokines may inhibit glucose production, further decreasing the body's energy stores. Finally, the liver and kidneys are sites of glucose production, and in a state of sepsis those organs may not receive enough oxygen, leading to decreased glucose production due to organ damage.

Other causes of serious illness that may cause hypoglycemia include liver failure and kidney failure. The liver is the main site of glucose production in the body, and any liver failure or damage will lead to decreased glucose production. While the kidneys are also sites of glucose production, their failure of glucose production is not significant enough to cause hypoglycemia. Instead, the kidneys are responsible for removing insulin from the body, and when this function is impaired in kidney failure, the insulin stays in circulation longer, leading to hypoglycemia.

==== Drugs ====
A number of medications have been identified which may cause hypoglycemia, through a variety of ways. Moderate quality evidence implicates the non-steroidal anti-inflammatory drug indomethacin and the anti-malarial quinine. Low quality evidence implicates lithium, used for bipolar disorder. Finally, very low quality evidence implicates a number of hypertension medications including angiotensin converting enzyme inhibitors (also called ACE-inhibitors), angiotensin receptor blockers (also called ARBs), and β-adrenergic blockers (also called beta blockers). Other medications with very low quality evidence include the antibiotics levofloxacin and trimethoprim-sulfamethoxazole, progesterone blocker mifepristone, anti-arrhythmic disopyramide, anti-coagulant heparin, and chemotherapeutic mercaptopurine.

If a person without diabetes accidentally takes medications that are traditionally used to treat diabetes, this may also cause hypoglycemia. These medications include insulin, glinides, and sulfonylureas. This may occur through medical errors in a healthcare setting or through pharmacy errors, also called iatrogenic hypoglycemia.

==== Surreptitious insulin use ====
When individuals take insulin without needing it, to purposefully induce hypoglycemia, this is referred to as surreptitious insulin use or factitious hypoglycemia. Some people may use insulin to induce weight loss, whereas for others this may be due to malingering or factitious disorder, which is a psychiatric disorder. Inappropriate usage of insulin is most common in people who have had exposure to diabetes management, such as healthcare workers, people who have relatives with diabetes, or people with diabetes themselves. The classic way to identify surreptitious insulin use is through blood work revealing high insulin levels with low C-peptide and proinsulin.

==== Alcohol misuse ====
The production of glucose is blocked by alcohol. In those who misuse alcohol, hypoglycemia may be brought on by a several-day alcohol binge associated with little to no food intake. The cause of hypoglycemia is multifactorial, where glycogen becomes depleted in a state of starvation. Glycogen stores are then unable to be repleted due to the lack of food intake, all compounded by the inhibition of glucose production by alcohol.

==== Hormone deficiency ====
Children with primary adrenal failure, also called Addison's disease, may experience hypoglycemia after long periods of fasting. Addison's disease is associated with chronically low levels of the stress hormone cortisol, which leads to decreased glucose production.

Hypopituitarism, leading to decreased growth hormone, is another cause of hypoglycemia in children, particularly with long periods of fasting or increased exercise.

==== Inborn errors of metabolism ====
Briefly, inborn errors of metabolism are a group of rare genetic disorders that are associated with the improper breakdown or storage of proteins, carbohydrates, or fatty acids. Inborn errors of metabolism may cause infant hypoglycemia, and much less commonly adult hypoglycemia.

Disorders that are related to the breakdown of glycogen, called glycogen storage diseases, may cause hypoglycemia. Normally, breakdown of glycogen leads to increased glucose levels, particularly in a fasting state. In glycogen storage diseases, however, glycogen cannot be properly broken down, leading to inappropriately decreased glucose levels in a fasting state, and thus hypoglycemia. The glycogen storage diseases associated with hypoglycemia include type 0, type I, type III, and type IV, as well as Fanconi syndrome.

Some organic and amino acid acidemias, especially those involving the oxidation of fatty acids, can lead to the symptom of intermittent hypoglycemia, as for example in combined malonic and methylmalonic aciduria (CMAMMA), propionic acidemia, or isolated methylmalonic acidemia.

==== Insulinomas ====
A primary B-cell tumor, such as an insulinoma, is associated with hypoglycemia. This is a tumor located in the pancreas. An insulinoma produces insulin, which in turn decreases glucose levels, causing hypoglycemia. Normal regulatory mechanisms are not in place, which prevent insulin levels from falling during states of low blood glucose. During an episode of hypoglycemia, plasma insulin, C-peptide, and proinsulin will be inappropriately high.

==== Non-B cell tumors ====
Hypoglycemia may occur in people with non-B cell tumors such as hepatomas, adrenocorticoid carcinomas, and carcinoid tumors. These tumors lead to a state of increased insulin, specifically increased insulin-like growth factor II, which decreases glucose levels.

==== Post-gastric bypass postprandial hypoglycemia ====
The Roux-en-Y gastric bypass, is a weight-loss surgery performed on the stomach, and has been associated with hypoglycemia, called post-gastric bypass postprandial hypoglycemia. Although the entire mechanism of hypoglycemia following this surgery is not fully understood, it is thought that meals cause very high levels of glucagon-like peptide-1 (also called GLP-1), a hormone that increases insulin, causing glucose levels to drop.

==== Autoimmune hypoglycemia ====
Antibodies can be formed against insulin, leading to autoimmune hypoglycemia. Antibodies are immune proteins produced by the body, that normally attack bacteria and viruses, but sometimes can attack normal human cells, leading to an autoimmune disorder. In autoimmune hypoglycemia, there are two possible mechanisms. In one instance, antibodies bind to insulin following its release associated with a meal, resulting in insulin being non-functional. At a later time, the antibodies fall off insulin, causing insulin to be functional again leading late hypoglycemia after a meal, called late postprandial hypoglycemia. Another mechanism causing hypoglycemia is due to antibodies formed against insulin receptors, called insulin receptor antibodies. The antibodies attach to insulin receptors and prevent insulin breakdown, or degradation, leading to inappropriately high insulin levels and low glucose levels.

==== Neonatal hypoglycemia ====
Low blood sugar may occur in healthy neonates aged less than 48 hours who have not eaten for a few hours. During the 48-hour neonatal period, the neonate adjusts glucagon and epinephrine levels following birth, which may trigger transient hypoglycemia. In children who are aged greater than 48 hours, serum glucose on average ranges from 70 to 100 mg/dL (3.9–5.5 mmol/L), similar to adults, with hypoglycemia being far less common.

== Pathophysiology ==
Glucose is the main source of energy for the brain, and a number of mechanisms are in place to prevent hypoglycemia and protect energy supply to the brain. The body can adjust insulin production and release, adjust glucose production by the liver, and adjust glucose use by the body. The body naturally produces the hormone insulin, in an organ called the pancreas. Insulin helps to regulate the amount of glucose in the body, especially after meals. Glucagon is another hormone involved in regulating blood glucose levels, and can be thought of as the opposite of insulin. Glucagon helps to increase blood glucose levels, especially in states of hunger.

When blood sugar levels fall to the low-normal range, the first line of defense against hypoglycemia is decreasing insulin release by the pancreas. This drop in insulin allows the liver to increase glycogenolysis. Glycogenolysis is the process of glycogen breakdown that results in the production of glucose. Glycogen can be thought of as the inactive, storage form of glucose. Decreased insulin also allows for increased gluconeogenesis in the liver and kidneys. Gluconeogenesis is the process of glucose production from non-carbohydrate sources, supplied from muscles and fat.

Once blood glucose levels fall out of the normal range, additional protective mechanisms work to prevent hypoglycemia. The pancreas is signaled to release glucagon, a hormone that increases glucose production by the liver and kidneys, and increases muscle and fat breakdown to supply gluconeogenesis. If increased glucagon does not raise blood sugar levels to normal, the adrenal glands release epinephrine. Epinephrine works to also increase gluconeogenesis and glycogenolysis, while also decreasing the use of glucose by organs, protecting the brain's glucose supply.

After hypoglycemia has been prolonged, cortisol and growth hormone are released to continue gluconeogenesis and glycogenolysis, while also preventing the use of glucose by other organs. The effects of cortisol and growth hormone are far less effective than epinephrine. In a state of hypoglycemia, the brain also signals a sense of hunger and drives the person to eat, in an attempt to increase glucose.

== Diagnosis ==
The most reliable method of identifying hypoglycemia is through identifying Whipple's triad. The components of Whipple's triad are a blood sugar level below 70 mg/dL (3.9 mmol/L), symptoms related to low blood sugar, and improvement of symptoms when blood sugar is restored to normal. Identifying Whipple's triad in a patient helps to avoid unnecessary diagnostic testing and decreases healthcare costs.

In those with a history of diabetes treated with insulin, glinides, or sulfonylurea, who demonstrate Whipple's triad, it is reasonable to assume the cause of hypoglycemia is due to insulin, glinides, or sulfonylurea use. In those without a history of diabetes with hypoglycemia, further diagnostic testing is necessary to identify the cause. Testing, during an episode of hypoglycemia, should include the following:

- Plasma glucose level, not point-of-care measurement
- Insulin level
- C-peptide level
- Proinsulin level
- Beta-hydroxybutyrate level
- Oral hypoglycemic agent screen
- Response of blood glucose level to glucagon
- Insulin antibodies

If necessary, a diagnostic hypoglycemic episode can be produced in an inpatient or outpatient setting. This is called a diagnostic fast, in which a patient undergoes an observed fast to cause a hypoglycemic episode, allowing for appropriate blood work to be drawn. In some, the hypoglycemic episode may be reproduced simply after a missed meal, whereas in others a fast may last up to 72 hours.

In those with a suspected insulinoma, imaging is the most reliable diagnostic technique, including ultrasound, computed tomography (CT) imaging, and magnetic resonance imaging (MRI).

=== Differential diagnosis ===
Other conditions that may present at the same time as hypoglycemia include the following:

- Alcohol or drug intoxication
- Cardiac arrhythmia
- Valvular heart disease
- Postprandial syndrome
- Hyperthyroidism
- Pheochromocytoma
- Post-gastric bypass hypoglycemia
- Generalized anxiety disorder
- Surreptitious insulin use
- Lab or blood draw error (lack of antiglycolytic agent in collection tube or during processing)

== Treatment ==
After hypoglycemia in a person is identified, rapid treatment is necessary and can be life-saving. The main goal of treatment is to raise blood glucose back to normal levels, which is done through various ways of administering glucose, depending on the severity of the hypoglycemia, what is on-hand to treat, and who is administering the treatment. A general rule used by the American Diabetes Association is the "15-15 Rule," which suggests consuming or administering 15 grams of a carbohydrate, followed by a 15-minute wait and re-measurement of blood glucose level to assess if blood glucose has returned to normal levels.

=== Self-treatment ===
If an individual recognizes the symptoms of hypoglycemia coming on, blood sugar should promptly be measured, and a sugary food or drink should be consumed. The person must be conscious and able to swallow. The goal is to consume 10–20 grams of a carbohydrate to raise blood glucose levels to a minimum of 70 mg/dL (3.9 mmol/L).

Examples of products to consume are:

- Glucose tabs or gel (refer to instructions on packet)
- Juice containing sugar like apple, grape, or cranberry juice, 1/2 cup (~120 mL)
- Soda or a soft-drink, 1/2 cup (~120 mL) (not diet soda)
- Candy
- Table sugar or honey, 1 tbsp (15 mL)

Improvement in blood sugar levels and symptoms are expected to occur in 15–20 minutes, at which point blood sugar should be measured again. If the repeat blood sugar level is not above 70 mg/dL (3.9 mmol/L), consume another 10–20 grams of a carbohydrate and remeasure blood sugar levels after 15–20 minutes. Repeat until blood glucose levels have returned to normal levels. After correcting blood glucose levels, people may consume a full meal within one hour to replenish glycogen stores.

Among common monosaccharides and disaccharides, glucose (e.g. glucose syrup) and sucrose (table sugar, e.g. some candy) are more effective than fructose (e.g. apple concentrate, honey) in treating hypoglycemia. These two sugars have a higher glycemic index than fructose. According to a 2017 meta-analysis, glucose tablets (GT) are 12% more likely to be effective within 15 minutes compared to dietary sources of sugar. Among the other pooled analyses, GT is not statistically significantly different from sucrose in effectiveness and is 21% more likely to be effective than orange juice. The meta-analysis also catalogs a number of RCTs dealing with other sugar sources along with their carbohydrate composition.

A 2019 systematic review suggests, based on very limited evidence, that oral administration (swallowing) of glucose (tabs) leads to a bigger improvement in blood glucose levels when compared to buccal administration (dextrose gel). This same review reported that, based on limited evidence, no difference was found in plasma glucose when administering combined oral and buccal glucose compared to only oral administration. In the very specific setting of children with concomitant malaria or respiratory tract infection, sublingual administration of sucrose (table sugar) may be more effective than oral administration. This entails dissolving the table sugar under the tongue.

=== Treatment by family, friends, or co-workers ===
Family, friends, and co-workers of those with hypoglycemia are often first to identify hypoglycemic episodes, and may offer help. Upon recognizing the signs and symptoms of hypoglycemia in a diabetic, a blood sugar level should first be measured using a glucose meter. If blood glucose is below 70 mg/dL (3.9 mmol/L), treatment will depend on whether the person is conscious and can swallow safely. If the person is conscious and able to swallow, the family, friend, or co-worker can help hypoglycemic consume 10–20 grams of a carbohydrate to raise blood glucose levels to a minimum of 70 mg/dL (3.9 mmol/L), using the same general procedures as for self-treatment (see the previous section).

If the person is unconscious, a glucagon kit may be used to treat severe hypoglycemia, which delivers glucagon either by injection into a muscle or through nasal inhalation. In the United States, glucacon kits are available by prescription for diabetic patients to carry in case of an episode of severe hypoglycemia. Emergency services should be called for further assistance.

==== Education ====
Family, friends, and co-workers of a person with diabetes may provide life-saving treatment in the case of a hypoglycemic episode. It is important for these people to receive training on how to recognize hypoglycemia, what foods to help the hypoglycemic eat, how to administer injectable or intra-nasal glucagon, and how to use a glucose meter.

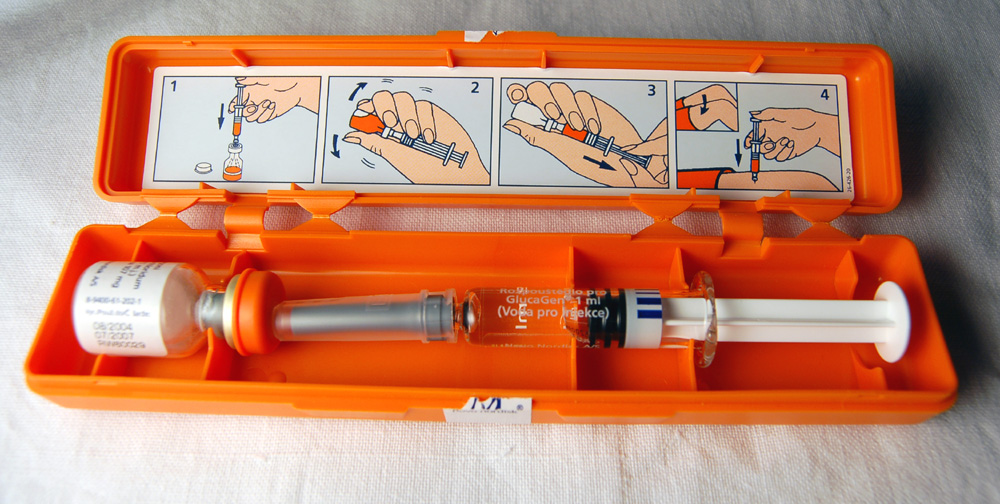
A glucagon kit used to treat severe hypoglycemia

=== Treatment by medical professionals ===
In a healthcare setting, treatment depends on the severity of symptoms and intravenous access. If a patient is conscious and able to swallow safely, food or drink may be administered, as well as glucose tabs or gel. In those with intravenous access, 25 grams of 50% dextrose is commonly administered. When there is no intravenous access, intramuscular or intra-nasal glucagon may be administered.

=== Other treatments ===
While the treatment of hypoglycemia is typically managed with carbohydrate consumption, glucagon injection, or dextrose administration, there are some other treatments available. Medications like diazoxide and octreotide decrease insulin levels, increasing blood glucose levels. Dasiglucagon was approved for medical use in the United States in March 2021, to treat severe hypoglycemia. Dasiglucagon (brand name Zegalogue) is unique because it is glucagon in a prefilled syringe or auto-injector pen, as opposed to traditional glucagon kits that require mixing powdered glucagon with a liquid.

Due to its original formulation containing large amounts of glucose, the soft drink Lucozade was recommended by diabetes charities in the United Kingdom as an immediate treatment for hypoglycemia; however, as the drink was reformulated to replace much of its glucose content with artificial sweeteners, this is no longer recommended.

== Prevention ==
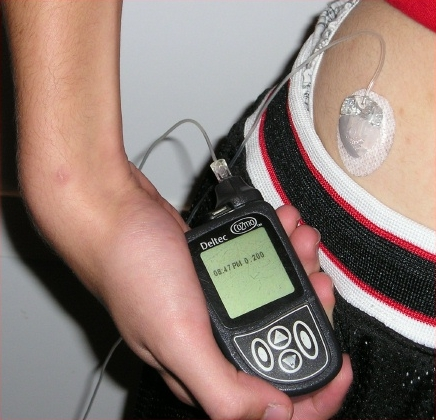
An insulin pump used to deliver appropriate levels of insulin

=== Diabetics ===
The prevention of hypoglycemia depends on the cause. In those with diabetes treated by insulin, glinides, or sulfonylurea, the prevention of hypoglycemia has a large focus on patient education and medication adjustments. The foundation of diabetes education is learning how to recognize the signs and symptoms of hypoglycemia, as well as learning how to act quickly to prevent worsening of an episode. Another cornerstone of prevention is strong self-monitoring of blood glucose, with consistent and frequent measurements. Research has shown that patients with type 1 diabetes who use continuous glucose monitoring systems with insulin pumps significantly improve blood glucose control. Insulin pumps help to prevent high glucose spikes, and help prevent inappropriate insulin dosing. Continuous glucose monitors can sound alarms when blood glucose is too low or too high, especially helping those with nocturnal hypoglycemia or hypoglycemic unawareness. In terms of medication adjustments, medication doses and timing can be adjusted to prevent hypoglycemia, or a medication can be stopped altogether.

=== Non-diabetics ===
In those with hypoglycemia who do not have diabetes, there are a number of preventative measures dependent on the cause. Hypoglycemia caused by hormonal dysfunction like lack of cortisol in Addison's disease or lack of growth hormone in hypopituitarism can be prevented with appropriate hormone replacement. The hypoglycemic episodes associated with non-B cell tumors can be decreased following surgical removal of the tumor, as well as following radiotherapy or chemotherapy to reduce the size of the tumor. In some cases, those with non-B cell tumors may have hormone therapy with growth hormone, glucocorticoid, or octreotide to also lessen hypoglycemic episodes. Post-gastric bypass hypoglycemia can be prevented by eating smaller, more frequent meals, avoiding sugar-filled foods, as well as medical treatment with an alpha-glucosidase inhibitor, diazoxide, or octreotide.

Some causes of hypoglycemia require treatment of the underlying cause to best prevent hypoglycemia. This is the case for insulinomas which often require surgical removal of the tumor for hypoglycemia to remit. In patients who cannot undergo surgery for removal of the insulinoma, diazoxide or octreotide may be used.

== Epidemiology ==
Hypoglycemia is common in people with type 1 diabetes, and in people with type 2 diabetes taking insulin, glinides, or sulfonylurea. It is estimated that type 1 diabetics experience two mild, symptomatic episodes of hypoglycemia per week. Additionally, people with type 1 diabetes have at least one severe hypoglyemic episode per year, requiring treatment assistance. In terms of mortality, hypoglycemia causes death in 6–10% of type 1 diabetics.

In those with type 2 diabetes, hypoglycemia is less common compared to type 1 diabetics, because medications that treat type 2 diabetes like metformin, glitazones, alpha-glucosidase inhibitors, glucagon-like peptide 1 agonists, and dipeptidyl peptidase IV inhibitors, do not cause hypoglycemia. Hypoglycemia is common in type 2 diabetics who take insulin, glinides, or sulfonylurea. Insulin use remains a key risk factor in developing hypoglycemia, regardless of diabetes type.

== History ==
Hypoglycemia was discovered by James Collip when he was working with Frederick Banting on purifying insulin in 1922. Collip was asked to develop an assay to measure the activity of insulin. He first injected insulin into a rabbit, and then measured the reduction in blood-glucose levels. Measuring blood glucose was a time-consuming step. Collip observed that if he injected rabbits with too large a dose of insulin, the rabbits began convulsing, went into a coma, and died. This observation simplified his assay. He defined one unit of insulin as the amount necessary to induce this convulsing hypoglycemic reaction in a rabbit. Collip later found he could save money, and rabbits, by injecting them with glucose once they were convulsing.

== Etymology ==
The word hypoglycemia is also spelled hypoglycaemia or hypoglycæmia. The term means 'low blood sugar' from Greek ὑπογλυκαιμία, from ὑπο- hypo- 'under' + γλυκύς glykys 'sweet' + αἷμᾰ haima 'blood'.
