= Neuroglycopenia =

Medical abnormality

Neuroglycopenia is a shortage of glucose (glycopenia) in the brain, usually due to hypoglycemia. Glycopenia affects the function of neurons, and alters brain function and behavior. Prolonged or recurrent neuroglycopenia can result in loss of consciousness, damage to the brain, and eventual death.

== Signs and symptoms ==
- Abnormal mentation, impaired judgment
- Nonspecific dysphoria, anxiety, moodiness, depression, crying, fear of dying, suicidal thoughts
- Negativism, irritability, belligerence, combativeness, rage
- Personality change, emotional lability
- Fatigue, weakness, apathy, lethargy, daydreaming
- Confusion, amnesia, dizziness, delirium
- Staring, "glassy" look, blurred vision, double vision
- Automatic behavior
- Difficulty speaking, slurred speech
- Ataxia, incoordination, sometimes mistaken for "drunkenness"
- Focal or general motor deficit, paralysis, hemiparesis
- Paresthesia, headache
- Stupor, coma, abnormal breathing
- Generalized or focal seizures
- Plasma glucose 20 mg/dL (1.1 mmol/L) or lower

Not all of the above manifestations occur in every case of hypoglycemia. There is no consistent order to the appearance of the symptoms. Specific manifestations vary by age and by the severity of the hypoglycemia. In older children and adults, moderately severe hypoglycemia can resemble mania, mental illness, drug intoxication, or drunkenness. In the elderly, hypoglycemia can produce focal stroke-like effects or a hard-to-define malaise. The symptoms of a single person do tend to be similar from episode to episode.

In the large majority of cases, hypoglycemia severe enough to cause seizures or unconsciousness can be reversed without obvious harm to the brain. Cases of death or permanent neurological damage occurring with a single episode have usually involved prolonged, untreated unconsciousness, interference with breathing, severe concurrent disease, or some other type of vulnerability. Nevertheless, brain damage or death has occasionally resulted from severe hypoglycemia.

== Metabolic responses ==
Most neurons have the ability to use other fuels besides glucose (e.g. lactic acid, ketones). Knowledge of the "switchover" process is incomplete. The most severe neuroglycopenic symptoms occur with hypoglycemia caused by excess insulin because insulin reduces the availability of other fuels by suppressing ketogenesis and gluconeogenesis.

A few types of specialized neurons, especially in the hypothalamus, act as glucose sensors, responding to changing levels of glucose by increasing or decreasing their firing rates. They can elicit a variety of hormonal, autonomic, and behavioral responses to neuroglycopenia. The hormonal and autonomic responses include release of counterregulatory hormones. There is some evidence that the autonomic nervous system can alter liver glucose metabolism independently of the counterregulatory hormones.

Adjustment of efficiency of transfer of glucose from blood across the blood–brain barrier into the central nervous system represents a third form of compensation which occurs more gradually. Levels of glucose within the central nervous system are normally lower than the blood, regulated by an incompletely understood transfer process. Chronic hypoglycemia or hyperglycemia seems to result in an increase or decrease in efficiency of transfer to maintain CNS levels of glucose within an optimal range.

In both young and old individuals, the brain may habituate to low glucose levels with a reduction of noticeable symptoms, sometimes despite neuroglycopenic impairment. In insulin-dependent diabetic patients this phenomenon is termed hypoglycemia unawareness and is a significant clinical problem when improved glycemic control is attempted. Another aspect of this phenomenon occurs in type I glycogenosis, when chronic hypoglycemia before diagnosis may be better tolerated than acute hypoglycemia after treatment is underway.

== Neuroglycopenia without hypoglycemia ==
A rare metabolic disease of the blood-brain glucose transport system has been described in which severe neuroglycopenic effects occurred despite normal blood glucose levels. Low levels of glucose were discovered in the cerebrospinal fluid (CSF), a condition referred to as hypoglycorrhachia [or hypoglycorrhacia].

Hypoglycorrhachia is associated with Glucose transporter type 1 GLUT1 deficiency syndrome (De Vivo disease).

Perhaps a much more common example of the same phenomenon occurs in the people with poorly controlled type 1 diabetes who develop symptoms of hypoglycemia at levels of blood glucose which are normal for most people.
