= Insulinoma =

Tumor of the pancreas which secretes insulin

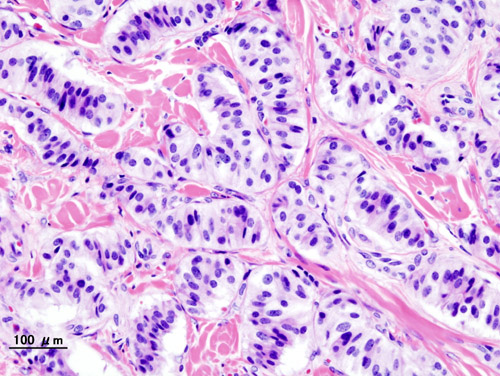
- Pathology of pancreatic endocrine tumour (insulinoma).
- Specialty: Oncology

An insulinoma is a tumour of the pancreas that is derived from beta cells and secretes insulin. It is a rare form of a neuroendocrine tumour. Most insulinomas are benign in that they grow exclusively at their origin within the pancreas, but a minority metastasize. Insulinomas are one of the functional pancreatic neuroendocrine tumour (PNET) group ("functional" because it increases production of insulin). In the Medical Subject Headings classification, insulinoma is the only subtype of "islet cell adenoma".

Beta cells secrete insulin in response to increases in blood glucose. The resulting increase in insulin acts to lower blood glucose back to normal levels, the point at which further secretion of insulin is stopped. In contrast, the secretion of insulin by insulinomas is rather independent of blood glucose; these tumours continue to secrete insulin, causing blood glucose levels to fall further below normal.

As a result, patients present symptoms of low blood glucose (hypoglycemia), which are improved by eating. The diagnosis of an insulinoma is usually made biochemically with low blood glucose, elevated insulin, proinsulin, and C-peptide levels, and confirmed by localizing the tumour with medical imaging or angiography. The definitive treatment is surgery.

== Signs and symptoms ==
Patients with insulinomas usually develop neuroglycopenic symptoms. These include recurrent headache, lethargy, diplopia, altered mental status, and blurred vision, particularly with exercise or fasting. Severe hypoglycemia may result in seizures, coma, and permanent neurological damage. Neuroglycopenic symptoms are more prominent in insulinoma, however patients may also have symptoms resulting from the catecholaminergic response to hypoglycemia (i.e. tremulousness, palpitations, tachycardia, sweating, hunger, anxiety, nausea). Weight gain is sometimes seen, as patients may eat more frequently to manage symptoms.

== Diagnosis ==
The diagnosis of insulinoma is suspected in a patient with symptomatic fasting hypoglycemia. The conditions of Whipple’s triad need to be met for the diagnosis of "true hypoglycemia" to be made:

1. symptoms and signs of hypoglycemia,
2. concomitant plasma glucose level of 55 mg/dL (3.0 mmol/L) or less, and
3. reversibility of symptoms with administration of glucose.

=== Blood tests ===
These blood tests are needed to diagnose insulinoma:

- low glucose levels
- elevated insulin levels
- elevated C-peptide levels

If available, a proinsulin level might be useful, as well. Other blood tests may help rule out other conditions which can cause hypoglycemia.

=== Suppression tests ===
Normally, endogenous insulin production is suppressed in the setting of hypoglycemia. A 72-hour fast, usually supervised in a hospital setting, can be done to see if insulin levels fail to suppress, which is a strong indicator of the presence of endogenous hyperinsulinemia, of which the most common cause is insulinoma (followed by autoimmune causes).

During the test, the patient may have calorie-free and caffeine-free liquids. Capillary blood glucose is measured every 4 hours using a reflectance meter, until values < 60 mg/dL (3.3 mmol/L) are obtained. Then, the frequency of blood glucose measurement is increased to every hour until values are < 49 mg/dL (2.7 mmol/L). At that point, or when the patient has symptoms of hypoglycemia, a blood test is drawn for serum glucose, insulin, proinsulin, and C-peptide levels. The fast is then stopped at that point, and the hypoglycemia is corrected with intravenous dextrose or carbohydrate-containing food or drink.

=== Diagnostic imaging ===
The insulinoma might be localized by noninvasive means, using ultrasound, CT scan, or MRI techniques. An indium-111 pentetreotide scan is more sensitive than ultrasound, CT, or MRI for detection of somatostatin receptor positive tumours, but not a good diagnostic tool for insulinomas. An endoscopic ultrasound has a sensitivity of 40-93% (depending on the location of the tumour) for detecting insulinomas.

Sometimes, angiography with percutaneous transhepatic pancreatic vein catheterization to sample the blood for insulin levels is required. Calcium can be injected into selected arteries to stimulate insulin release from various parts of the pancreas, which can be measured by sampling blood from their respective veins. The use of calcium stimulation improves the specificity of this test.During surgery to remove an insulinoma, an intraoperative ultrasound can sometimes localize the tumour, which helps guide the surgeon in the operation and has a higher sensitivity than noninvasive imaging tests.

== Treatment ==
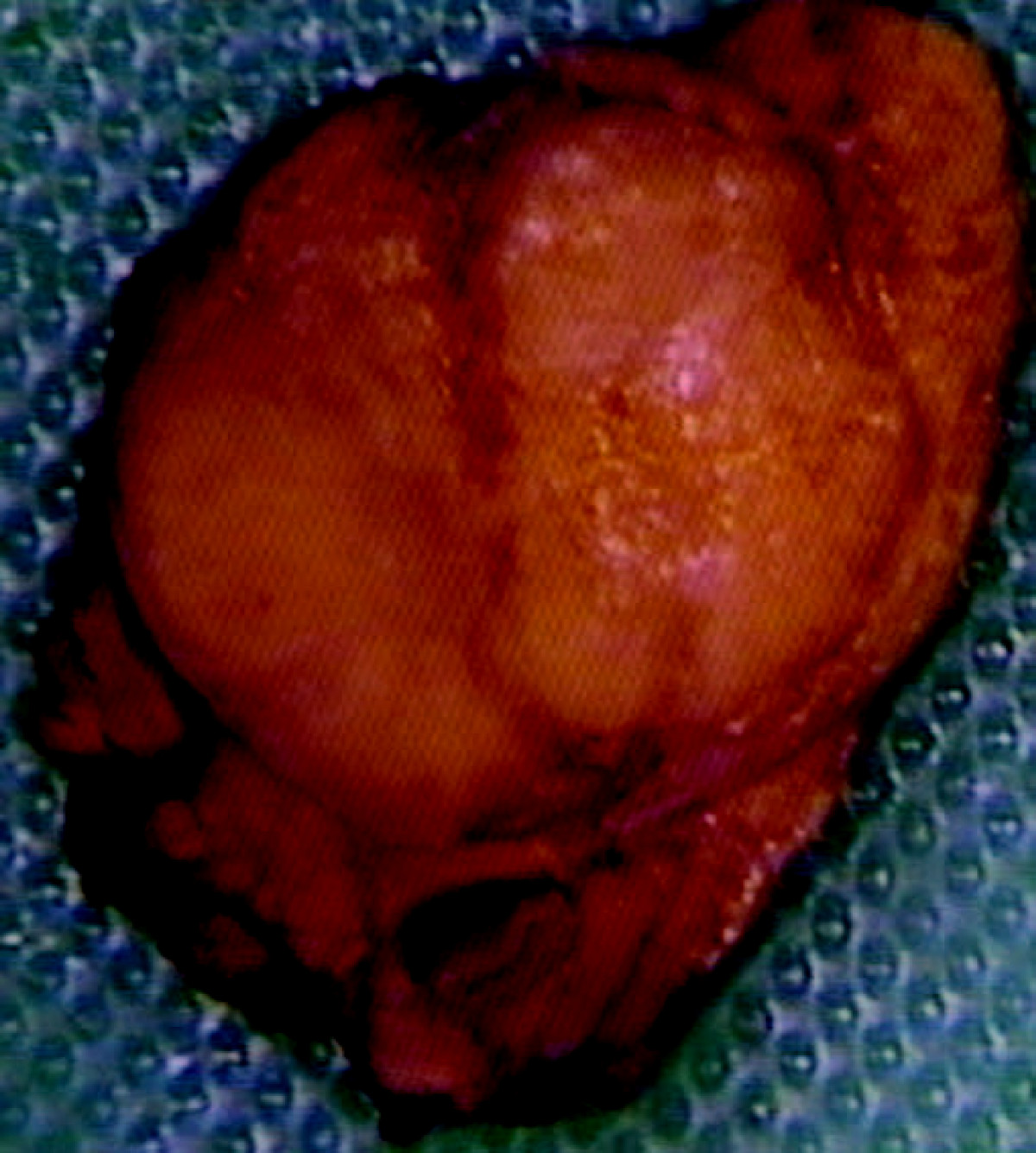
Gross appearance of insulinoma showing the typical red-brown appearance of tumour

The definitive management is the surgical removal of the insulinoma. This may involve removing part of the pancreas, as well (Whipple procedure and distal pancreatectomy). Medications such as diazoxide and somatostatin can be used to block the release of insulin for patients who are not surgical candidates or who otherwise have inoperable tumours. Streptozotocin is used in islet cell carcinomas which produce excessive insulin. Combination chemotherapy is used, either doxorubicin and streptozotocin, or fluorouracil and streptozocin in patients where doxorubicin is contraindicated. In metastasizing tumours with intrahepatic growth, hepatic arterial occlusion or embolization can be used.

== Prognosis ==
Most patients with benign insulinomas can be cured with surgery. Persistent or recurrent hypoglycemia after surgery tends to occur in patients with multiple tumours. About 2% of patients develop diabetes mellitus after their surgery.

== Incidence ==
Insulinomas are rare neuroendocrine tumours with an incidence estimated at one to four new cases per million persons per year. Insulinoma is one of the most common types of tumours arising from the islets of Langerhans cells (pancreatic endocrine tumours). Estimates of malignancy (metastases) range from 5 to 30%. Over 99% of insulinomas originate in the pancreas, with rare cases from ectopic pancreatic tissue. About 5% of cases are associated with tumours of the parathyroid glands and the pituitary (multiple endocrine neoplasia type 1) and are more likely to be multiple and malignant. Most insulinomas are small, less than 2 cm.

== History ==
Hypoglycemia was first recognized in the 19th century. In the 1920s, after the discovery of insulin and its use in the treatment of diabetics, hyperinsulinism was suspected to be a cause of hypoglycemia in nondiabetics. A pioneering description of hyperinsulinism as a cause of hypoglycemia was published by Seale Harris in 1924. The first report of a surgical cure of hypoglycemia by removing an islet cell tumour was in 1929.

An insulinoma removed from a woman in Munich provided insulin mRNA that was used in the first human gene cloning experiment. In 1979, Axel Ullrich cloned this gene into E. coli. Most therapeutic insulin used today derives from this woman's tumour.

== Additional images ==
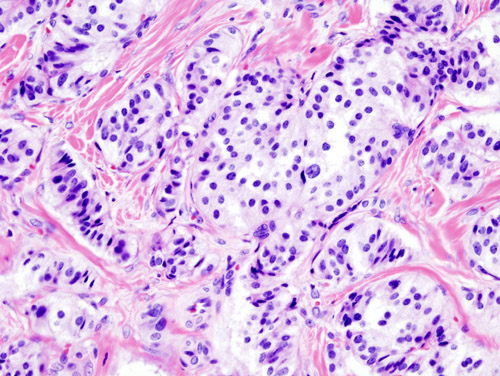
Pancreatic insulinoma

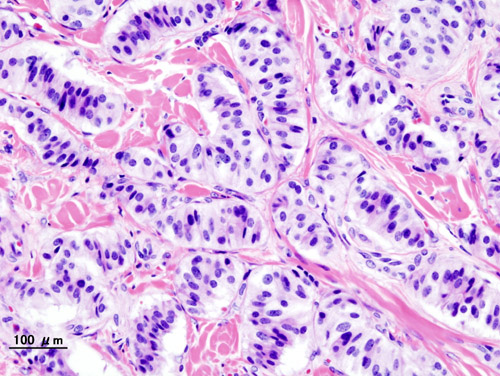
Pancreatic insulinoma

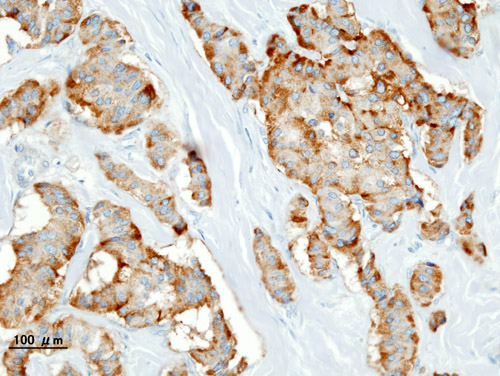
Chromogranin A

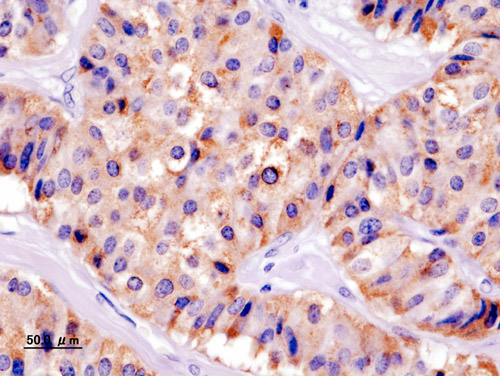
Insulin immunostain

== See also ==
- Causes of hypoglycemia
- Metastatic insulinoma
