= RX871024 =

Experimental anti-diabetic drug

Identifiers
- IUPAC name: 2-(2-imidazolin-2-yl)-1-phenyl-1H-indole
- CAS Number: 142872-84-2
- PubChem CID: 91885462
- ChemSpider: 8396346

Chemical and physical data
- Formula: C_{17}H_{15}N_{3}
- Molar mass: 261.328 g·mol^{−1}
- 3D model (JSmol): Interactive image
- SMILES: C1CN=C(N1)C2=CC3=CC=CC=C3N2C4=CC=CC=C4
- InChI: InChI=1S/C17H15N3/c1-2-7-14(8-3-1)20-15-9-5-4-6-13(15)12-16(20)17-18-10-11-19-17/h1-9,12H,10-11H2,(H,18,19); Key:XUIUIZMIIPNHIJ-UHFFFAOYSA-N

RX871024 is an experimental drug containing an imidazoline moiety, developed by Reckitt Benckiser. The development of RX871024 was discontinued in 1997. It is known for its potent ability to enhance insulin action. RX871024 stimulates insulin secretion from pancreatic beta cells through multiple mechanisms.

== Mechanism of action ==
Unlike traditional sulfonylureas, RX871024 not only closes ATP-sensitive potassium (K_{ATP}) channels—leading to membrane depolarization, opening of voltage-gated calcium channels, and increased intracellular calcium—but also directly stimulates exocytosis of insulin-containing granules, even under conditions where calcium levels are held constant.

This compound inhibits several potassium channels, including K_{ATP}, K_{Ca}, and delayed rectifier potassium channels, and interacts specifically with the Kir6.2 (KCNJ11) subunit of the K_{ATP} channel, distinguishing its mode of action from sulfonylureas, which target the sulfonylurea receptor 1 (ABCC8). Additionally, RX871024 mobilizes calcium from intracellular, thapsigargin-sensitive stores via redox-dependent pathways involving cytochrome P-450. Its insulinotropic effect is further enhanced by activation of protein kinase C and increases in diacylglycerol (DAG) levels, while protein kinase A activity appears to play a permissive role. RX871024 also modulates the phosphorylation of cytosolic proteins such as nonmuscle myosin heavy chain-A, which may be involved in insulin secretion signaling.

Collectively, these multifaceted actions make RX871024 a potential lead compound for the development of novel antidiabetic therapies.

== Synthesis ==

Ex 1: The reaction between ethyl 1-phenyl-1H-indole-2-carboxylate [20538-24-3] (1) and ethylenediamine (2) gives RX871024 (3).

Prec: Patent: Also, reaction of 1-phenylindole-2-carbonitrile, PC20095505 with ethylenediamine monotosylate [14034-59-4] gives higher yield.
