= Cantú syndrome =

- Other names: Hypertrychotic osteochondrodysplasia
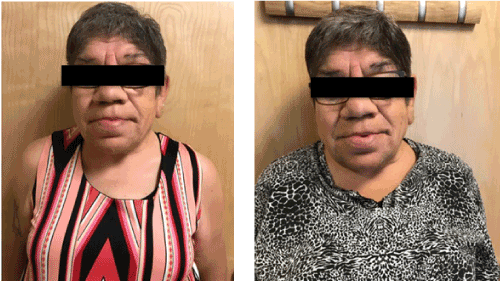
- This photo shows a person with Cantú syndrome, who has coarse facial features that are characteristic of this syndrome.
- Symptoms: Hypertrichosis, osteochondrodysplasia, cardiomegaly, others
- Causes: Mutation in ABCC9 gene
- Diagnostic method: Echocardiogram, X-ray
- Treatment: Scoliosis is managed via bracing

Cantú syndrome is a rare genetic disorder characterized by hypertrichosis, osteochondrodysplasia, and cardiomegaly, among other symptoms. Fewer than 50 cases have been described in the literature; they are associated with mutations in the ABCC9 (SUR2) and KCNJ8 (K_{ir}6.1) genes, which encode subunits of ATP-sensitive potassium channels (K_{ATP} channels).

== Signs and symptoms ==
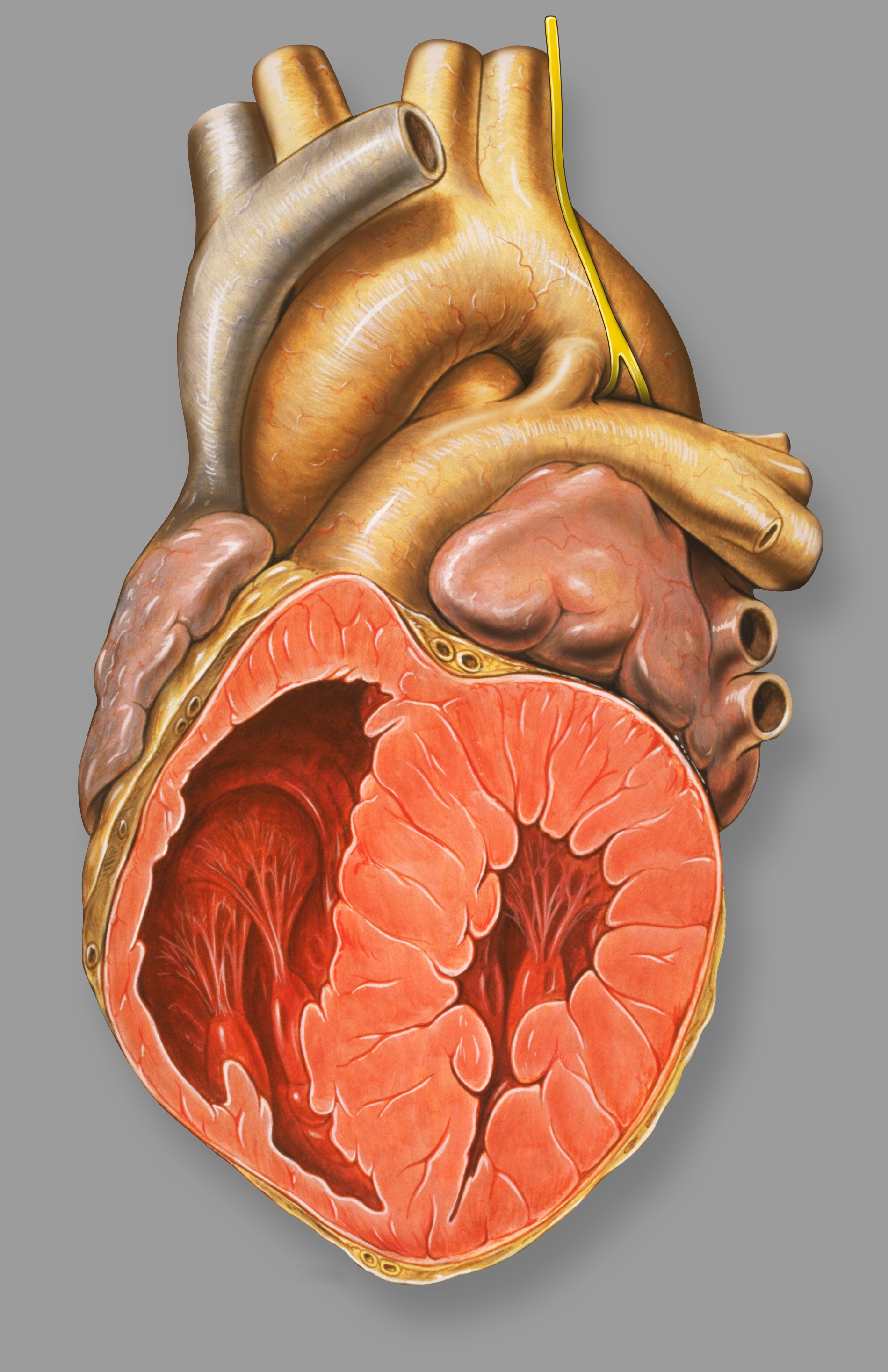
Heart/patent ductus arteriosus.

The main features of this condition are hypertrichosis, osteochondrodysplasia, and cardiomegaly. There is also a characteristic facies. Other features include patent ductus arteriosus, congenital hypertrophy of the left ventricle, and pericardial effusions.

Neurodevelopmental outcome appears normal, but obsessive traits and anxiety have been reported. It may also be associated with recurrent infections with low immunoglobulin levels and gastric bleeding, and additional possible associations include lymphoedema and heterochromia iridis.

Most people with Cantú syndrome eventually develop high-output cardiac hypertrophy or cardiomegaly and congestive heart failure due to long-term low systemic vascular resistance and consequent cardiac remodeling.

== Cause ==
Cantú syndrome is inherited via an autosomal dominant manner.

Cantú syndrome is caused by gain-of-function mutations in genes encoding subunits of ATP-sensitive potassium channels (K_{ATP} channels), including ABCC9 (encoding the sulfonylurea receptor 2 or SUR2) and KCNJ8 (encoding K_{ir}6.1). It is apparently inherited in an autosomal dominant fashion. Both the ABCC9 and KCNJ8 genes are located on the short arm of chromosome 12 (12p12). In one study, mutations in ABCC9 were responsible for 25 of 31 cases of Cantú syndrome.Physiologically, SUR2 is significant in vascular relaxation, among other effects. An increase in O_{2} tension after birth, plus decreasing PGE2 (a common prostaglandin) causes inhibition of voltage-gated potassium channels and contraction of smooth muscle (in ductus).

The effects of K_{ATP} potassium channel openers like minoxidil, diazoxide, and pinacidil have been found to mimic the symptoms of Cantú syndrome. Examples of these K_{ATP} potassium channel opener effects include hypertrichosis, pericardial effusions, pulmonary hypertension, edema, and coarsening of facial features, among others. Relatedly, there has been concern that excessive doses of minoxidil and other K_{ATP} potassium channel openers might cause a "drug-induced Cantú syndrome".

== Diagnosis ==
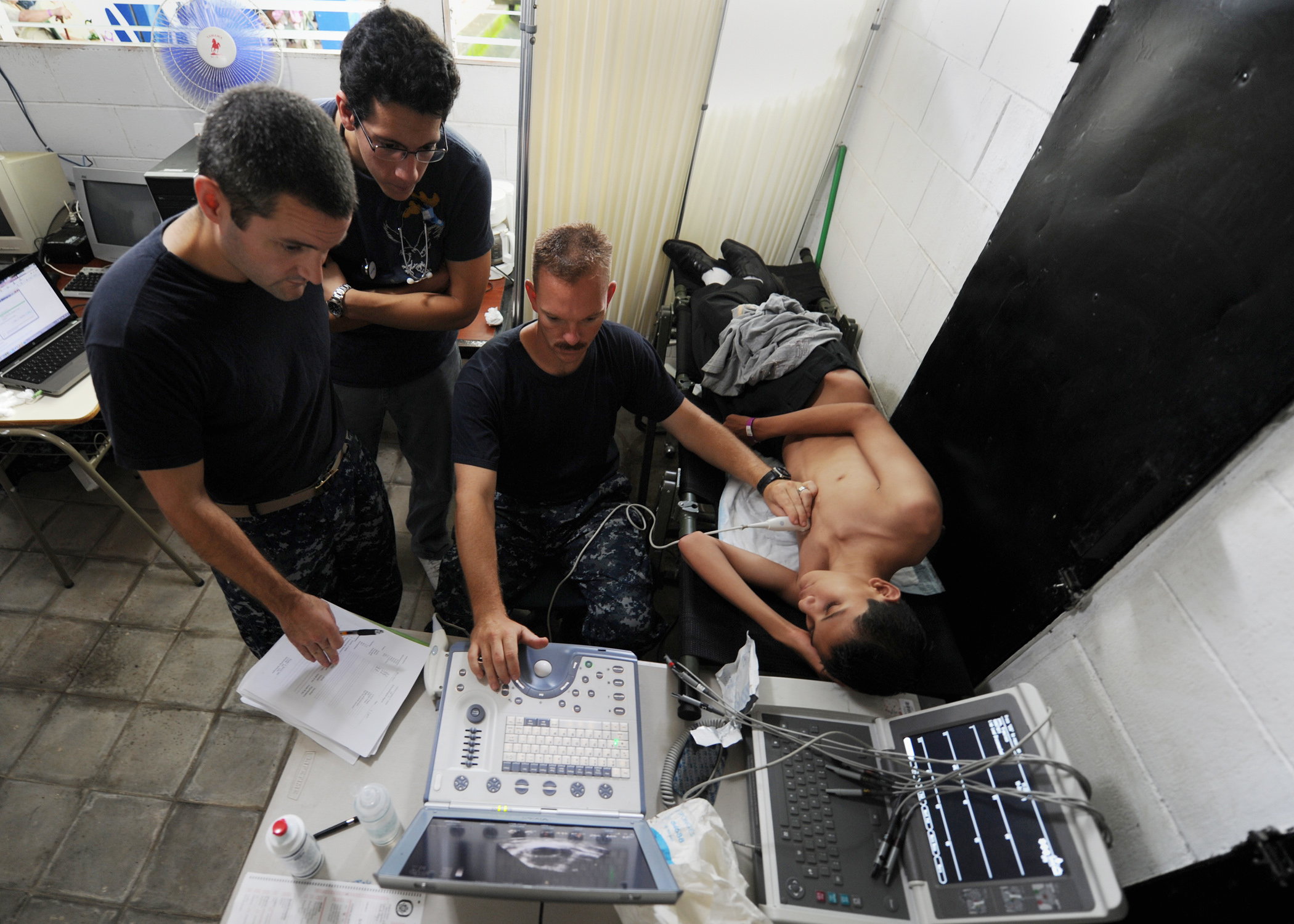
Medical personnel perform echocardiogram

This condition can be diagnosed by genetic testing. Furthermore, an echocardiogram and X-ray may help in the diagnosis.

=== Differential diagnosis ===
The differential diagnosis of this condition consists of the following:

- Hypertrophic cardiomyopathy
- Beckwith-Wiedemann syndrome
- Berardinelli-Seip congenital lipodystrophy

== Treatment ==
The treatment/management for Cantú syndrome is based on surgical option for patent ductus arteriosus in early life and management of scoliosis via bracing. Furthermore, regular echocardiograms are needed for the individual who has exhibited this condition. K_{ATP} potassium channel blockers like glibenclamide (glyburide) might be useful in the treatment of Cantú syndrome.

== History ==
This condition was described in 1982 by José María Cantú and colleagues.

== See also ==
- Atrichia with papular lesions
- List of cutaneous conditions
- ATP-sensitive potassium channel § Stimulation of hair growth
