= Hyperinsulinemia =

Abnormal increase in insulin in the bloodstream relative to glucose

- Other names: Hyperinsulinaemia
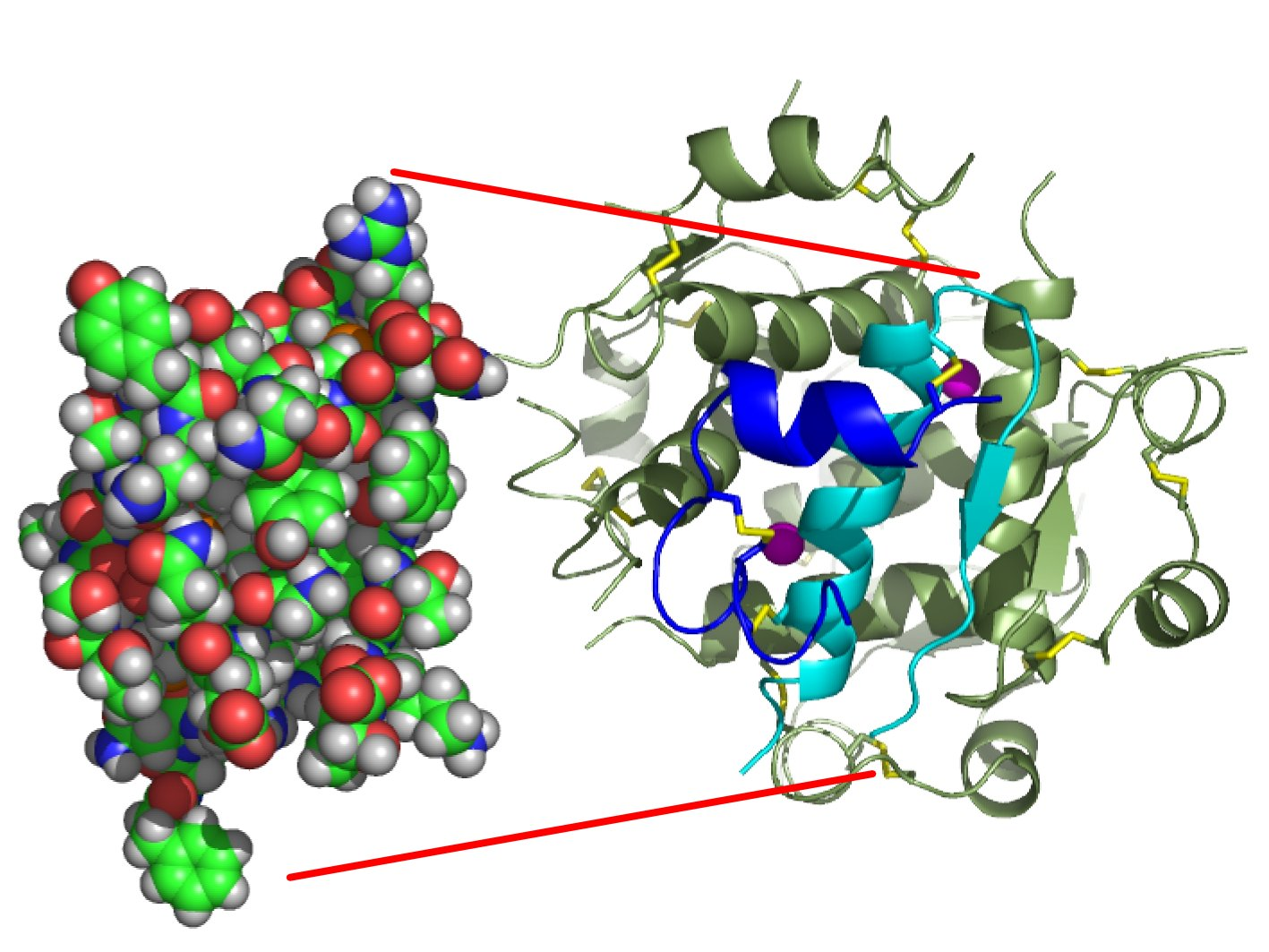
- Insulin binding to its receptor
- Specialty: Endocrinology

Hyperinsulinemia is a condition in which there are excess levels of insulin circulating in the blood relative to the level of glucose. While it is often mistaken for diabetes or hyperglycaemia, hyperinsulinemia can result from a variety of metabolic diseases and conditions, as well as non-nutritive sugars in the diet. While hyperinsulinemia is often seen in people with early stage type 2 diabetes mellitus, it is not the cause of the condition and is only one symptom of the disease (for opposing view see review in). Type 1 diabetes only occurs when pancreatic beta-cell function is impaired. Hyperinsulinemia can be seen in a variety of conditions including diabetes mellitus type 2, in neonates and in drug-induced hyperinsulinemia. It can also occur in congenital hyperinsulinism, including nesidioblastosis.

Hyperinsulinemia is associated with hypertension, obesity, dyslipidemia, insulin resistance, and glucose intolerance. These conditions are collectively known as metabolic syndrome. This close association between hyperinsulinemia and conditions of metabolic syndrome suggest related or common mechanisms of pathogenicity. Hyperinsulinemia has been shown to "play a role in obese hypertension by increasing renal sodium retention".

In type 2 diabetes, the cells of the body become resistant to the effects of insulin as the receptors which bind to the hormone become less sensitive to insulin concentrations resulting in hyperinsulinemia and disturbances in insulin release. With a reduced response to insulin, the beta cells of the pancreas secrete increasing amounts of insulin in response to the continued high blood glucose levels resulting in hyperinsulinemia. In insulin resistant tissues, a threshold concentration of insulin is reached causing the cells to uptake glucose and therefore decreases blood glucose levels. Studies have shown that the high levels of insulin resulting from insulin resistance might enhance insulin resistance.

Studies on mice with genetically reduced circulating insulin suggest that hyperinsulinemia plays a causal role in high fat diet-induced obesity. In this study, mice with reduced insulin levels expended more energy and had fat cells that were reprogrammed to burn some energy as heat.

Hyperinsulinemia in neonates can be the result of a variety of environmental and genetic factors. If the mother of the infant is a diabetic and is not able to properly control her blood glucose levels, the hyperglycemic maternal blood can create a hyperglycemic environment in the fetus. To compensate for the increased blood glucose levels, fetal pancreatic beta cells can undergo hyperplasia. The rapid division of beta cells results in increased levels of insulin being secreted to compensate for the high blood glucose levels. Following birth, the hyperglycemic maternal blood is no longer accessible to the neonate resulting in a rapid drop in the newborn's blood glucose levels. As insulin levels are still elevated this may result in hypoglycemia. To treat the condition, high concentration doses of glucose are given to the neonate as required maintaining normal blood glucose levels. The hyperinsulinemia condition subsides after one to two days.

== Symptoms and signs ==
Abdominal obesity, often assessed using the waist-to-hip ratio, is associated with hyperinsulinemia. Direct measurement of serum insulin levels can identify elevated insulin, which may precede the onset of impaired glucose tolerance or hyperglycemia by 10 to 20 years. Consequently, normal fasting blood glucose levels alone do not rule out early-stage hyperinsulinemia.

Some patients may experience a variety of symptoms when hypoglycemia is present, including:

- Temporary muscle weakness
- Brain fog
- Fatigue
- Anxiety
- Temporary thought disorder, or inability to concentrate
- Visual problems, such as blurred vision or double vision
- Headaches
- Shaking/Trembling
- Thirst

If a person experiences any of these symptoms, a visit to a qualified medical practitioner is advised, and diagnostic blood testing, such as Fasting Insulin Levels, may be required.

== Causes ==
Possible causes include:

- Atherosclerosis
- Hyperglycemia from consumption of excess sugars (includes juices, sauces, alcohol) & processed Carbohydrates.
- Neoplasm
- Overeating
- Inactivity & lack of muscle strength. See Physical inactivity and Physical activity.
- Pancreatic cancer
- Trans fats

=== Link to obesity ===
Often, individuals get metabolically (internally) sick before showing signs of obesity. But visceral obesity can go undetected, and is extremely dangerous. Lifestyle choices including diet, exercise, and sleep deprivation play the largest role in Hyperinsulinemia & insulin resistance.

Belly fat is a strong predictor of high insulin levels. Obesity is characterized by an excess of adipose tissue – insulin increases the synthesis of fatty acids from glucose, facilitates the entry of glucose into adipocytes and inhibits breakdown of fat in adipocytes.

On the other hand, adipose tissue is known to secrete various metabolites, hormones and cytokines that may play a role in causing hyperinsulinemia. Specifically cytokines secreted by adipose tissue directly affect the insulin signalling cascade, and thus insulin secretion. Adiponectins are cytokines that are inversely related to percent body fat; that is people with a low body fat will have higher concentrations of adiponectins where as people with high body fat will have lower concentrations of adiponectins. In 2011, it was reported that hyperinsulinemia is strongly associated with low adiponectin concentrations in obese people, though whether low adiponectin has a causal role in hyperinsulinemia remains to be established.

- May lead to hypoglycemia or diabetes
- Increased risk of polyendocrine metabolic ovarian syndrome (PMOS)
- Increased synthesis of VLDL (hypertriglyceridemia)
- Hypertension (insulin increases sodium retention by the renal tubules)
- Coronary Artery Disease (increased insulin damages endothelial cells)
- Increased risk of cardiovascular disease
- Weight gain and lethargy (possibly connected to an underactive thyroid)
- Obesity and hyperinsulinemia have some links with some types of cancer

== Diagnosis ==
Fasting Insulin levels in blood may be measured as this can be elevated in the presence of normal glucose. Diagnosis is often made by checking normal levels of glucose that exceed 1.7 mmol/L (30 mg/dL) when 1 mg of glucagon is administered IM or IV. In addition, urine samples or blood samples are also used to check levels of ketones and low free fatty acids.

After diagnosis, most people are required to continue regular check ups for evaluations.

=== Differential diagnosis ===
- Hyperinsulinemia is often mistaken for diabetes or hypoglycaemia. These are separate, albeit related, conditions. Adipocytes will generate triglycerides in the presence of insulin but refers to a liver condition rather than a pancreatic one.

== Treatment ==
Treatment is typically achieved via diet and exercise, although metformin may be used to reduce insulin levels in some patients (typically where obesity is present). A referral to a dietician is beneficial. Another method used to lower excessively high insulin levels is cinnamon, specifically Ceylon cinnamon, as was demonstrated when supplemented in clinical human trials.

A healthy diet that is low in simple sugars and processed carbohydrates, and high in fiber, and vegetable protein is often recommended. This includes replacing white bread with whole-grain bread, reducing intake of foods composed primarily of starch such as potatoes, and increasing intake of legumes and green vegetables, particularly soy.

Regular monitoring of weight, blood sugar, and insulin are advised, as hyperinsulinemia may develop into diabetes mellitus type 2.

It has been shown in many studies that physical exercise improves insulin sensitivity. The mechanism of exercise on improving insulin sensitivity is not well understood however it is thought that exercise causes the glucose receptor GLUT4 to translocate to the membrane. As more GLUT4 receptors are present on the membrane more glucose is taken up into cells decreasing blood glucose levels which then causes decreased insulin secretion and some alleviation of hyperinsulinemia. Another proposed mechanism of improved insulin sensitivity by exercise is through AMPK activity. The beneficial effect of exercise on hyperinsulinemia was shown in a study in 2009, where they found that improving fitness through exercise significantly decreases blood insulin concentrations. Moreover, a diet that consists of high amounts of carbs have been linked to weight gain and obesity in rodents. Although this has not been tested in humans, it is assumed that it could aid with the prevention of weight gain in humans, and possibly obesity. Medications have also been studied to treat hyperinsulinemia, although these might have some side effects, these could be used as an alternative.

== See also ==
- Metabolic syndrome (Syndrome X)
- Acanthosis nigricans
