= P-1075 =

Clinical data
- Other names: P1075
- Drug class: ATP-sensitive potassium channel opener; Vasodilator; Antihypertensive agent
- ATC code: None

Identifiers
- IUPAC name: 1-cyano-2-(2-methylbutan-2-yl)-3-pyridin-3-ylguanidine
- CAS Number: 60559-98-0
- PubChem CID: 43345
- ChemSpider: 39498
- UNII: RA77IZ6B2F
- ChEBI: CHEBI:92004
- ChEMBL: ChEMBL11458
- CompTox Dashboard (EPA): DTXSID60209335
- ECHA InfoCard: 100.217.104

Chemical and physical data
- Formula: C_{12}H_{17}N_{5}
- Molar mass: 231.303 g·mol^{−1}
- 3D model (JSmol): Interactive image
- SMILES: CCC(C)(C)N=C(NC#N)NC1=CN=CC=C1
- InChI: InChI=1S/C12H17N5/c1-4-12(2,3)17-11(15-9-13)16-10-6-5-7-14-8-10/h5-8H,4H2,1-3H3,(H2,15,16,17); Key:HKZNADVVGXKQDL-UHFFFAOYSA-N

P-1075 is an ATP-sensitive potassium channel opener which was under development for the treatment of androgenic alopecia (pattern hair loss), arrhythmias, and ischemic heart disorders but was never marketed. It has been found to stimulate cultured hair follicles and to promote hair growth in balding stump-tailed macaques. The drug was being developed by AstraZeneca and LEO Pharma. It reached phase 2 clinical trials for alopecia and the preclinical research stage of development for arrhythmia and ischemic heart disorders prior to the discontinuation of its development by 2000. In terms of chemical structure, P-1075 is a guanidine derivative and a more potent analogue of pinacidil.

== See also ==
- List of investigational hair loss drugs
- ATP-sensitive potassium channel § Stimulation of hair growth
