= Sulfonylurea receptor =

ATP-binding cassette, subfamily C (CFTR/MRP), member 8

Identifiers
- Symbol: ABCC8
- Alt. symbols: SUR1
- NCBI gene: 6833
- HGNC: 59
- OMIM: 600509
- RefSeq: NM_000352
- UniProt: Q09428

Other data
- Locus: Chr. 11 p15.1
Search for
- Structures: Swiss-model
- Domains: InterPro

ATP-binding cassette, subfamily C (CFTR/MRP), member 9

Identifiers
- Symbol: ABCC9
- Alt. symbols: SUR2A, SUR2B
- NCBI gene: 10060
- HGNC: 60
- OMIM: 601439
- RefSeq: NM_005691
- UniProt: O60706

Other data
- Locus: Chr. 12 p12.1
Search for
- Structures: Swiss-model
- Domains: InterPro

In molecular biology, the sulfonylurea receptors (SUR) are membrane proteins which are the molecular targets of the sulfonylurea class of antidiabetic drugs whose mechanism of action is to promote insulin release from pancreatic beta cells. More specifically, SUR proteins are subunits of the inward-rectifier potassium ion channels K_{ir}6.x (6.1 and 6.2). The association of four K_{ir}6.x and four SUR subunits form an ion conducting channel commonly referred to as the K_{ATP} channel.

Three forms of the sulfonylurea receptor are known, SUR1 encoded by the ABCC8 gene, and SUR2A and SUR2B, which are splice variants arising from a single ABCC9 gene.

== Function ==
The primary function of the sulfonylurea receptor is to sense intracellular levels of the nucleotides ATP and ADP and in response facilitate the open or closing its associated K_{ir}6.x potassium channel. Hence, the K_{ATP} channel monitors the energy balance within the cell.

Depending on the tissue in which the K_{ATP} channel is expressed, altering the membrane potential can trigger a variety of downstream events. For example, in pancreatic beta cells, high levels of glucose lead to increased production of ATP, which, in turn, binds to the K_{ATP} channel resulting in channel closure. The relative depolarization (decrease in membrane hyperpolarization), in turn, opens voltage-dependent calcium channels increasing intracellular calcium concentrations, which triggers exocytosis of insulin.

Under cerebral ischemic conditions, SUR1, the regulatory subunit of the K_{ATP} and the NC_{Ca-ATP} channels, is expressed in neurons, astrocytes, oligodendrocytes, endothelial cells and by reactive microglia. Blockade of SUR1 receptors with glibenclamide has been involved in improved outcome in animal stroke models and investigational human studies by preventing brain swelling and enhancing neuroprotection.

== Tissue distribution ==
The isoforms of the sulfonylurea receptor have the following tissue distribution:

- Adipose tissue - SUR2B/K_{ir}6.1
- Pancreatic beta cells - SUR1/K_{ir}6.2
- Cardiac myocytes - SUR2A
- Skeletal muscle - SUR2A
- Smooth muscle - SUR2B
- Brain - SUR1, SUR2A and SUR2B

== Disease linkage ==
The SUR1 protein is coded by the ABCC8 gene and is associated with congenital hyperinsulinism and susceptibility to type 2 diabetes.
