= Akinori Noma =

Akinori Noma (野間 昭典, Noma Akinori) is a Japanese electrophysiologist and Former Chair in Department of Physiology and Biophysics, Kyoto University, Kyoto, Japan. He is currently also a member of F1000. Prof. Akinori Noma has made many significant contributions to physiology including the discovery of the K_{ATP} ion channel.
