= Tahnik =

Islamic ceremony for a newborn baby

Taḥnīk (تَحْنِيكِ) is an Islamic ceremony of rubbing the palate of a newborn baby with honey, sweet juice or pressed dates. Originally the date was softened by mastication by the pious person and rubbed on the infant's palate. The Arabic word ḥanak (حنك), pl. aḥnāk (احناك), means 'palate', from which the word taḥnīk (تَحْنِيكِ) is derived.

During the lifetime of Muhammad, Muslims would bring their newborns for him to perform taḥnīk upon them.

In the collected Ḥadīth books, Sahih Muslim, by Muslim ibn al-Hajjaj, Kitab al-Adab (كتاب الآداب) "Book of Etiquette", contains the account of the origin of the ceremonial ritual performed by the newborn's mother or father:

"It is recommended to perform taḥnīk on the day of birth; to take the newborn to a righteous person or for parents to perform taḥnīk on them. It is permissible to name the newborn on the day of birth, and it is recommended to use the names 'Abdullah, Ibrahim, and the names of all other prophets, (Peace Be Upon Them)."

Anas bin Malik reports this account:

"I took 'Abdullah b. Abi Talha Ansari to Allah's Messenger (ﷺ) at the time of his birth. Allah's Messenger (ﷺ) was at that time wearing a woollen cloak and besmearing the camels with tar. He said: Have you got with you the dates? I said: Yes. He took hold of the dates and put them in his mouth and softened them, then opened the mouth of the infant and put that in it and the child began to lick it. Thereupon Allah's Messenger (ﷺ) said: The Ansar have a liking for the dates, and he (the Holy Prophet) gave him the name of 'Abdullah."

The taḥnīk also exercises the muscles of the mouth and helps with the circulation of blood in the mouth - this may help the baby to be able to suck and take mother's milk. It is also credited to prevent neonatal hypoglycemia in newborn babies.
