= ABCC9 =

Protein-coding gene in humans

Identifiers
- Aliases: ABCC9, ABC37, ATFB12, CANTU, CMD1O, SUR2, ATP binding cassette subfamily C member 9, IDMYS
- External IDs: OMIM: 601439; MGI: 1352630; GeneCards: ABCC9

Gene location (Human)
Chr.	Chromosome 12 (human)
Band	12p12.1	Start	21,797,389 bp
Band	12p12.1	End	21,942,543 bp

Gene location (Mouse)
Chr.	Chromosome 6 (mouse)
Band	6 G2|6 74.35 cM	Start	142,533,588 bp
Band	6 G2|6 74.35 cM	End	142,648,041 bp
RNA expression pattern
Bgee	Human / Mouse (ortholog); Top expressed in: gastrocnemius muscle; muscle of thigh; Achilles tendon; left ventricle; apex of heart; right lobe of liver; gastric mucosa; stromal cell of endometrium; buccal mucosa cell; body of uterus / Top expressed in: triceps brachii muscle; sternocleidomastoid muscle; temporal muscle; digastric muscle; body of femur; ankle; ascending aorta; myocardium of ventricle; soleus muscle; intercostal muscle; More reference expression data
BioGPS	n/a
Gene ontology
Molecular function	nucleotide binding; transmembrane transporter binding; transporter activity; potassium channel regulator activity; sulfonylurea receptor activity; ATPase activity; ATP binding; ATPase-coupled inorganic anion transmembrane transporter activity; potassium channel activity; ATPase-coupled transmembrane transporter activity
Cellular component	integral component of membrane; membrane; plasma membrane; sarcomere; sarcolemma; inward rectifying potassium channel
Biological process	potassium ion transport; defense response to virus; signal transduction; transmembrane transport; potassium ion import across plasma membrane; regulation of cardiac conduction
Sources:Amigo / QuickGO
Orthologs
Databases	NCBI: entry; OMA: entry
Species	Human	Mouse
Entrez	10060	20928
Ensembl	ENSG00000069431	ENSMUSG00000030249
UniProt	O60706; Q8N4N7	P70170
RefSeq (mRNA)	NM_005691; NM_020297; NM_020298; NM_001377273; NM_001377274	NM_001044720; NM_011511; NM_021041; NM_021042; NM_021043 NM_001310143
RefSeq (protein)	NP_005682; NP_064693; NP_001364202; NP_001364203	NP_001038185; NP_001297072; NP_035641; NP_066378; NP_066379
Location (UCSC)	Chr 12: 21.8 – 21.94 Mb	Chr 6: 142.53 – 142.65 Mb
PubMed search
- Wikidata
View/Edit Human	View/Edit Mouse

ATP-binding cassette, sub-family C member 9 (ABCC9) also known as sulfonylurea receptor 2 (SUR2) is an ATP-binding cassette transporter that in humans is encoded by the ABCC9 gene.

== Function ==
The protein encoded by this gene is a member of the superfamily of ATP-binding cassette (ABC) transporters. ABC proteins transport various molecules across extra- and intra-cellular membranes. ABC genes are divided into seven distinct subfamilies (ABC1, MDR/TAP, MRP, ALD, OABP, GCN20, White). This protein is a member of the MRP subfamily which is involved in multi-drug resistance. This protein is thought to form ATP-sensitive potassium channels in cardiac, skeletal, and vascular and non-vascular smooth muscle. Protein structure suggests a role as the drug-binding channel-modulating subunit of the extrapancreatic ATP-sensitive potassium channels. Alternative splicing of this gene results in several products, two of which result from differential usage of two terminal exons and one of which results from exon deletion.

- SUR2A — uses exon 38A
- SUR2B — uses exon 38B
- SUR-delta-14 — lack exon 14 and uses exon 38A

== Clinical significance ==
The gene has been associated with dilated cardiomyopathy and Cantú syndrome.

A variant has also been associated with circa 25 minutes more sleep per day in humans; lack thereof has been associated with three hours less sleep per day in fruit flies.

A study involving 12,901 individuals from Iceland demonstrated a link between variants of the ABCC9 gene and higher vocal pitch in both men and women. This discovery establishes ABCC9 as the first identified genetic locus associated with vocal pitch.

== See also ==
- Sulfonylurea receptor
