= Neonatal hypoglycemia =

Neonatal Hypoglycemia
- Causes: Hyperinsulinism, limited glycogen stores, increases glucose use, decreased gluconeogenesis, depleted glycogen stores
- Risk factors: Maternal-Gestational diabetes, eclampsia, drug use. Neonate- small for gestational age, inadequate feeding, respiratory distress
- Diagnostic method: Blood sample
- Treatment: 40% dextrose gel, 10% dextrose influsion, early breastfeeding

Neonatal hypoglycemia, or low blood sugar in newborn babies, occurs when an infant's blood glucose level is below normal. Diagnostic thresholds vary internationally. In the US, hypoglycemia is when the blood glucose level is below 30 mg/dL within the first 24 hours of life and below 45 mg/dL after, but international standards differ. The newborn's age, birth weight, metabolic needs, and wellness state substantially impact their blood glucose level. This is a treatable condition, but its treatment depends on the cause of the hypoglycemia. Though it is treatable, it can be fatal if gone undetected. Among metabolic problems in newborns, hypoglycemia is the most prevalent.

Neonatal hypoglycemia is hypothesized to occur in 1 to 3 births out of every 1,000 births, but the true number is not known since there is no international standard for measurement. It often occurs in premature and small babies and babies of diabetic mothers.

== Signs and symptoms ==
The way in which neonatal hypoglycemia symptoms may be presented is vague or hard to tell apart from other conditions. The symptoms can be confused with:

- hypocalcemia
- Sepsis
- CNS disorders
- Cardiorespiratory problems

Neonatal hypoglycemia can also show no symptoms in some newborns or may be life-threatening.

Some observed symptoms are (these symptoms may be transient but reoccurring):

- Jitteriness
- hypothermia
- irritability
- pallor
- tremors
- twitching
- weak or high pitched cry
- lethargy
- hypotonia
- generalized seizures
- coma
- cyanosis
- apnea
- rapid and irregular respirations
- sweating
- eye rolling
- refusal to feed
- hunger

== Causes ==
=== Risk factors ===
==== Mother ====
Risk factors in the mother that increased the risk of developing hypoglycemia shortly after birth include:

- Type 1 diabetes
- Gestational diabetes mellitus (Transient)
- Intrapartum glucose administration (Transient)
- Gestational hypertension
- Preeclampsia
- Terbutaline administration (Transient)
- Intrauterine growth restriction (Transient)
- Perinatal stress or asphyxia (Transient)

==== Baby ====
Factors that tend to increase the risk of developing hypoglycemia shortly after birth are:

- hypothermia (Transient)
- polycythemia (Transient)
- hyperinsulinism (Recurrent)
- IEMs (Recurrent)
- Beckwith-Wiedmann syndrome (Recurrent)
- nesidioblastosis (Recurrent)
- Rh isoimmunization (Recurrent)
- Certain endocrine disorders (Recurrent)
- fetal hydrops
- Prematurity (Transient)
- congenital malformations
- small for gestational age (Transient)
- Large for gestational age (Transient)

=== Hyperinsulinism ===
The most common cause on neonatal hypoglycemia is hyperinsulinism. Hyperinsulinism is also called persistent hyperinsulemic hypoglycemia of infancy (PHHI). This is seen very frequently to the neonates born from mothers with diabetes. Congenital hyperinsulinism is correlated with the abnormality of beta-cell regulation within the pancreas. Isolated islet adenoma, which is a focal disease, is often the cause of congenital hyperinsulism. Drug-induced hyperinsulisim is correlated with the administration insulin or use of hypoglycemic medication. In critical cases, a drug called Diazoxide is availed to stop any secretion of insulin.

=== Limited glycogen stores ===
Limited glycogen storage occurs in premature newborns or newborns that had intrauterine growth retardation.

=== Increased glucose use ===
Major causes of increased glucose use in a newborn include hyperthermia, polycythemia, sepsis, and growth hormone deficiency.

=== Decreased gluconeogenesis ===
Two major issues that cause decreased gluconogeneis are inborn errors of metabolism and adrenal insufficiency.

=== Depleted glycogen stores ===
Most common causes of depleted glycogen stores are starvation and asphyxia-perinatal stress.

== Mechanism ==
There are many types of hypoglycemia, including transient and reoccurring. Each is associated with different risk factors and may have many underlying causes. Neonatal hypoglycemia occurs because an infants brain is dependent on a healthy supply of glucose. During the last trimester of pregnancy, glucose is stored in the liver, heart, and skeletal muscles. All newborns experience a physiological and transient fall in blood glucose, reaching a nadir at 2–3 hours of age before slowly rising over the next 24 hours. Newborns do have the ability to use an alternative form of energy, especially if breastfed. However, some newborns are only able to compensate this glucose deficiency up to a certain limit. Infants who have hyperinsulinism may increase the risk to develop hypoglycemia. There are other conditions that can increase the risk of an infant becoming hypoglycemic (See Risks).

== Diagnosis ==
Screening for hypoglycemia is done on every neonate on admission in the US but this is not recommended practice in all developed countries. One way of screening includes a heel stick to test the blood glucose level at the bedside. Diagnosing hypoglycemia in neonates requires two consecutive blood glucose readings of less than 40 mg/dL to properly diagnose hypoglycemia. Bedside glucose monitoring is only effective if the equipment is accurate, rapid, and reliable. This form of testing is often faster and more cost effective. Laboratory serum glucose testing is the most accurate way of testing blood glucose levels. These specimens are either taken from the heel, arterial, or venous punctures and must be store immediately on ice in order to prevent glycolysis, further altering the results. US guidelines recommended that the hypoglycemic neonate should have a glucose test every 2–4 hours for the first 24 hours of life. Guidelines in the UK, however, recommend pre-feed screening of at-risk infants at 2–4 hours of age (to avoid false positives when blood glucose is, ordinarily, at its lowest at 2–3 hours of age) and at the subsequent feed until a blood glucose level of >2.0 mmol/L (36 mg/dL) on at least two consecutive occasions and is feeding well. 1. Medical history Maternal diabetes mellitus, gestational hypertension, neonatal erythrocytosis, neonatal haemolysis of incompatible blood groups, perinatal asphyxia, severe infection, sclerosis, neonatal respiratory distress syndrome, etc., especially in premature babies, babies younger than gestational age and those who are underfed in the early stages of life are at risk of neonatal hypoglycaemia. 2. Clinical manifestations Neonatal hypoglycemia should be considered if there are atypical clinical manifestations, if the symptoms improve after glucose infusion, or if there are neurological symptoms and signs that cannot be easily explained. 3. Blood glucose measurement Postnatal glucose monitoring is the main method of early detection of neonatal hypoglycaemia. In particular, children at risk of neonatal hypoglycaemia should have their blood glucose monitored within one hour of birth.

== Management ==
Some infants are treated with 40% dextrose (a form of sugar) gel applied directly to the infant's mouth. There are two main ways that neonatal hypoglycemia is treated. The first way includes intravenous infusion of glucose. For less severe, borderline, asymptomatic hypoglycemic neonates early introduction of breast milk can be effective for raising glucose levels to a healthy level. Any infant at risk of hypoglycemia should have their blood sugar taken again one hour after birth. Oral glucose is another option to restore normal glucose levels if the newborn is having difficulty latching to the breast or breastfeeding is not an option, however, breast milk is proven to be a better source as it includes glucose and carbohydrates. It is recommended by the American Academy of Pediatrics that infants feed within the first hour of life with the glucose reading being 30 minutes after this feeding for an accurate result. If the initial feeding does not raise the newborn's blood glucose above 40 mg/dL then the newborn must receive an IV infusion of 10% dextrose in water as a mini bolus as 2 mL/kg over 1 minute. Following the mini bolus a continuous infusion of 10% dextrose in water at 80-100 mL/kg/day in order to maintain a healthy serum glucose level between 40 and 50 mg/dL. Maintaining newborn thermoregulation is a large part in preventing further hypoglycemia as well.

=== Nursing care management ===
The biggest nursing concern for a neonate experiencing hypoglycemia is the physical assessment to potentially find the cause. It is also essential to prevent environmental factors such as cold stress that may predispose the newborn for further decreasing blood sugar. Within the physical assessment, comorbidities of hypoglycemia should also be assessed such as intolerance of feeding, or respiratory distress. Another important nursing intervention is assisting the mother in successful breastfeeding as this can prevent and treat hypoglycemia.

If an IV infusion of 10% dextrose in water is initiated then the nurse must monitor for:

•Circulatory overload

•Hyperglycemia

•Glycosuria

•Intracellular dehydration

== Outcomes ==
Infants that experienced hypoglycemic episodes requiring treatment within the first few days of life have a higher chance of developing neurological or neurodevelopmental diagnoses than normoglycemic infants. The severity of the effects resulting from the hypoglycemic episode depend on the length of the hypoglycemic episode and how low the neonate's blood glucose levels drop during the episode. Because glucose is an essential nutrient for the brain, untreated neonatal hypoglycemia causes irreversible damage to both the posterior, occipital and cortex regions of the brain. These areas function in cognition, adaptability, and visual skills. Long term complications of neonatal hypoglycemia may include:

- Neurologic damage that results in mental retardation
- Developmental delay
- Personality disorders
- Recurrent seizure activity
- Impaired cardiovascular function

== Research ==
Continuous glucose monitoring devices have been suggested to be helpful for improving blood glucose monitoring in neonatal infants, however, the devices have not been approved for use in this age group and the potential benefits and risks are not clear from available studies.

The taḥnīk also exercises the muscles of the mouth and helps with the circulation of blood in the mouth - this may help the baby to be able to suck and take mother's milk. It is also credited to prevent neonatal hypoglycemia in newborn babies.

== See also ==
- Congenital hyperinsulinism
- Hyperinsulinemic hypoglycemia

== Bibliography ==
- Walker, Marsha (2011). Breastfeeding management for the clinician: using the evidence. Sudbury, Mass: Jones and Bartlett Publishers. ISBN 978-0-7637-6651-1.
