= ATP-sensitive potassium channel =

Family of transport proteins

potassium inwardly-rectifying channel, subfamily J, member 8

Identifiers
- Symbol: KCNJ8
- Alt. symbols: K_{ir}6.1
- NCBI gene: 3764
- HGNC: 6269
- OMIM: 600935
- RefSeq: NM_004982
- UniProt: Q15842

Other data
- Locus: Chr. 12 p12.1
Search for
- Structures: Swiss-model
- Domains: InterPro

potassium inwardly-rectifying channel, subfamily J, member 11

Identifiers
- Symbol: KCNJ11
- Alt. symbols: K_{ir}6.2
- NCBI gene: 3767
- HGNC: 6257
- OMIM: 600937
- RefSeq: NM_000525
- UniProt: Q14654

Other data
- Locus: Chr. 11 p15.1
Search for
- Structures: Swiss-model
- Domains: InterPro

ATP-binding cassette, sub-family C (CFTR/MRP), member 8

Identifiers
- Symbol: ABCC8
- Alt. symbols: SUR1
- NCBI gene: 6833
- HGNC: 59
- OMIM: 600509
- RefSeq: NM_000352
- UniProt: Q09428

Other data
- Locus: Chr. 11 p15.1
Search for
- Structures: Swiss-model
- Domains: InterPro

ATP-binding cassette, sub-family C (CFTR/MRP), member 9

Identifiers
- Symbol: ABCC9
- Alt. symbols: SUR2A, SUR2B
- NCBI gene: 10060
- HGNC: 60
- OMIM: 601439
- RefSeq: NM_005691
- UniProt: O60706

Other data
- Locus: Chr. 12 p12.1
Search for
- Structures: Swiss-model
- Domains: InterPro

An ATP-sensitive potassium channel (or K_{ATP} channel) is a type of potassium channel that is gated by intracellular nucleotides, ATP and ADP. ATP-sensitive potassium channels are composed of K_{ir}6.x-type subunits and sulfonylurea receptor (SUR) subunits, along with additional components. K_{ATP} channels are widely distributed in plasma membranes; however some may also be found on subcellular membranes. These latter classes of K_{ATP} channels can be classified as being either sarcolemmal ("sarcK_{ATP}"), mitochondrial ("mitoK_{ATP}"), or nuclear ("nucK_{ATP}").

== Discovery and structure ==
K_{ATP} channels were first identified in cardiac myocytes by Akinori Noma in Japan. Glucose-regulated K_{ATP} channel activity was found in pancreatic beta cells by Frances Ashcroft at the University of Oxford. The closure of K_{ATP} channels leads to increased insulin secretion in beta cells and reduces glucagon secretion in alpha cells.

SarcK_{ATP} are composed of eight protein subunits (octamer). Four of these are members of the inward-rectifier potassium ion channel family K_{ir}6.x (either K_{ir}6.1 or K_{ir}6.2), while the other four are sulfonylurea receptors (SUR1, SUR2A, and SUR2B). The K_{ir} subunits have two transmembrane spans and form the channel's pore. The SUR subunits have three additional transmembrane domains, and contain two nucleotide-binding domains on the cytoplasmic side. These allow for nucleotide-mediated regulation of the potassium channel, and are critical in its roles as a sensor of metabolic status. These SUR subunits are also sensitive to sulfonylureas, MgATP (the magnesium salt of ATP), and some other pharmacological channel openers. While all sarcK_{ATP} are constructed of eight subunits in this 4:4 ratio, their precise composition varies with tissue type.

MitoK_{ATP} were first identified in 1991 by single-channel recordings of the inner mitochondrial membrane. The molecular structure of mitoK_{ATP} is less clearly understood than that of sarcK_{ATP}. Some reports indicate that cardiac mitoK_{ATP} consist of K_{ir}6.1 and K_{ir}6.2 subunits, but neither SUR1 nor SUR2. More recently, it was discovered that certain multiprotein complexes containing succinate dehydrogenase can provide activity similar to that of K_{ATP} channels.

The presence of nucK_{ATP} was confirmed by the discovery that isolated patches of nuclear membrane possess properties, both kinetic and pharmacological, similar to plasma membrane K_{ATP} channels.

== Sensor of cell metabolism ==
=== Regulation of gene expression ===
Four genes have been identified as members of the K_{ATP} gene family. The sur1 and kir6.2 genes are located in chr11p15.1 while kir6.1 and sur2 genes reside in chr12p12.1. The kir6.1 and kir6.2 genes encode the pore-forming subunits of the K_{ATP} channel, with the SUR subunits being encoded by the sur1 (SUR1) gene or selective splicing of the sur2 gene (SUR2A and SUR2B).

Changes in the transcription of these genes, and thus the production of K_{ATP} channels, are directly linked to changes in the metabolic environment. High glucose levels, for example, induce a significant decrease in the kir6.2 mRNA level – an effect that can be reversed by lower glucose concentration. Similarly, 60 minutes of ischemia followed by 24 to 72 hours of reperfusion leads to an increase in kir6.2 transcription in left ventricle rat myocytes.

A mechanism has been proposed for the cell's K_{ATP} reaction to hypoxia and ischemia. Low intracellular oxygen levels decrease the rate of metabolism by slowing the TCA cycle in the mitochondria. Unable to transfer electrons efficiently, the intracellular NAD+/NADH ratio decreases, activating phosphotidylinositol-3-kinase and extracellular signal-regulated kinases. This, in turn, upregulates c-jun transcription, creating a protein which binds to the sur2 promoter.

One significant implication of the link between cellular oxidative stress and increased K_{ATP} production is that overall potassium transport function is directly proportional to the membrane concentration of these channels. In cases of diabetes, K_{ATP} channels cannot function properly, and a marked sensitivity to mild cardiac ischemia and hypoxia results from the cells' inability to adapt to adverse oxidative conditions.

=== Metabolite regulation ===
The degree to which particular compounds are able to regulate K_{ATP} channel opening varies with tissue type, and more specifically, with a tissue's primary metabolic substrate.

In pancreatic beta cells, ATP is the primary metabolic source, and the ATP/ADP ratio determines K_{ATP} channel activity. Under resting conditions, the weakly inwardly rectifying K_{ATP} channels in pancreatic beta cells are spontaneously active, allowing potassium ions to flow out of the cell and maintaining a negative resting membrane potential (slightly more positive than the K^{+} reversal potential). In the presence of higher glucose metabolism, and consequently increased relative levels of ATP, the K_{ATP} channels close, causing the membrane potential of the cell to depolarize, activating voltage-gated calcium channels, and thus promoting the calcium-dependent release of insulin. The change from one state to the other happens quickly and synchronously, due to C-terminus multimerization among proximate K_{ATP} channel molecules.

Cardiomyocytes, on the other hand, derive the majority of their energy from long-chain fatty acids and their acyl-CoA equivalents. Cardiac ischemia, as it slows the oxidation of fatty acids, causes an accumulation of acyl-CoA and induces K_{ATP} channel opening while free fatty acids stabilize its closed conformation. This variation was demonstrated by examining transgenic mice, bred to have ATP-insensitive potassium channels. In the pancreas, these channels were always open, but remained closed in the cardiac cells.

=== Mitochondrial k_{atp} and the regulation of aerobic metabolism ===
Upon the onset of a cellular energy crisis, mitochondrial function tends to decline. This is due to alternating inner membrane potential, imbalanced trans-membrane ion transport, and an overproduction of free radicals, among other factors. In such a situation, mitoK_{ATP} channels open and close to regulate both internal Ca^{2+} concentration and the degree of membrane swelling. This helps restore proper membrane potential, allowing further H^{+} outflow, which continues to provide the proton gradient necessary for mitochondrial ATP synthesis. Without aid from the potassium channels, the depletion of high energy phosphate would outpace the rate at which ATP could be created against an unfavorable electrochemical gradient.

Nuclear and sarcolemmal K_{ATP} channels also contribute to the endurance of and recovery from metabolic stress. In order to conserve energy, sarcK_{ATP} open, reducing the duration of the action potential while nucK_{ATP}-mediated Ca^{2+} concentration changes within the nucleus favor the expression of protective protein genes.

== Cardiovascular k_{atp} channels and protection from ischemic injury ==
Cardiac ischemia, while not always immediately lethal, often leads to delayed cardiomyocyte death by necrosis, causing permanent injury to the heart muscle. One method, first described by Keith Reimer in 1986, involves subjecting the affected tissue to brief, non-lethal periods of ischemia (3–5 minutes) before the major ischemic insult. This procedure is known as ischemic preconditioning ("IPC"), and derives its effectiveness, at least in part, from K_{ATP} channel stimulation.

Both sarcK_{ATP} and mitoK_{ATP} are required for IPC to have its maximal effects. Selective mitoK_{ATP} blockade with 5-hydroxydecanoic acid ("5-HD") or MCC-134 completely inhibits the cardioprotection afforded by IPC, and genetic knockout of sarcK_{ATP} genes in mice has been shown to increase the basal level of injury compared to wild type mice. This baseline protection is believed to be a result of sarcK_{ATP}'s ability to prevent cellular Ca^{2+} overloading and depression of force development during muscle contraction, thereby conserving scarce energy resources.

Absence of sarcK_{ATP}, in addition to attenuating the benefits of IPC, significantly impairs the myocyte's ability to properly distribute Ca^{2+}, decreasing sensitivity to sympathetic nerve signals, and predisposing the subject to arrhythmia and sudden death. Similarly, sarcK_{ATP} regulates vascular smooth muscle tone, and deletion of the kir6.2 or sur2 genes leads to coronary artery vasospasm and death.

Upon further exploration of sarcK_{ATP}'s role in cardiac rhythm regulation, it was discovered that mutant forms of the channel, particularly mutations in the SUR2 subunit, were responsible for dilated cardiomyopathy, especially after ischemia/reperfusion. It is still unclear as to whether opening of K_{ATP} channels has completely pro- or antiarrhythmic effects. Increased potassium conductance should stabilize membrane potential during ischemic insults, reducing the extent infarct and ectopic pacemaker activity. On the other hand, potassium channel opening accelerates repolarization of the action potential, possibly inducing arrhythmic reentry.

== Stimulation of hair growth ==
ATP-sensitive potassium channel openers including minoxidil (via its active metabolite minoxidil sulfate), diazoxide, and pinacidil are associated with hypertrichosis in humans. Other ATP-sensitive potassium channel openers, like cromakalim and P-1075 (an analogue of pinacidil), stimulate hair growth in balding stump-tailed macaques, although another ATP-sensitive potassium channel opener, RP-49356, was not efficacious. The ATP-sensitive potassium channel openers naminidil (BMS-234303) and P-1075 were under formal development for treatment of hair loss and reached phase 2 clinical trials for this indication but were never marketed. Minoxidil also has other actions, and it is not fully clear whether opening of ATP-sensitive potassium channels is responsible for the hair growth-stimulatory effects of minoxidil and other ATP-sensitive potassium channel openers. In any case, K_{ATP} channel activation via minoxidil and other agents has been found to directly stimulate follicular growth in cultured hair follicles ex vivo. This can be reversed by the K_{ATP} inhibitor tolbutamide. In addition, Cantú syndrome, which involves gain-of-function mutations in K_{ATP} channel subunits (specifically SUR2 and K_{IR}6.1), is associated with hypertrichosis.

== See also ==
- Cardiac action potential § Channels
