= Nesidioblastosis =

- Specialty: Endocrinology

Nesidioblastosis is a controversial medical term for hyperinsulinemic hypoglycemia attributed to excessive insulin production by pancreatic beta cells that have an abnormal microscopic appearance. The term was coined in the first half of the 20th century. The abnormal microscopic features of the tissue included the presence of islet cell enlargement, pancreatic islet cell dysplasia, beta cells budding from ductal epithelium, and islets close to ducts.

By the 1970s, nesidioblastosis was primarily used to describe the pancreatic dysfunction associated with persistent congenital hyperinsulinism and in most cases from the 1970s until the 1980s it was used as a synonym for what is now referred to as congenital hyperinsulinism. Most congenital hyperinsulinism is now known to be caused by different mechanisms than excessive proliferation of beta cells in a fetal pattern, and the term fell into disfavor after it was recognized in the late 1980s that the characteristic tissue features of nesidioblastosis were sometimes seen in pancreatic tissue from normal infants and even from adults, and are therefore not consistently associated with hyperinsulinemic hypoglycemia.

In recent years, the term has been revived to describe a form of acquired hyperinsulinism with beta cell hyperplasia found in adults, especially after gastrointestinal surgery. Evidence of mechanisms explaining the ability of weight loss surgery to induce modern-day nesidioblastosis has yet to be found; any such mechanisms are of intense interest to diabetes researchers.

== See also ==
- Congenital hyperinsulinism
- Neonatal hypoglycemia
