= Kir6.2 =

Protein-coding gene in the species Homo sapiens

KCNJ11

Identifiers
- Aliases: KCNJ11, BIR, HHF2, IKATP, KIR6.2, MODY13, PHHI, TNDM3, potassium voltage-gated channel subfamily J member 11, potassium inwardly rectifying channel subfamily J member 11, PNDM2
- External IDs: OMIM: 600937; MGI: 107501; GeneCards: KCNJ11

Gene location (Human)
Chr.	Chromosome 11 (human)
Band	11p15.1	Start	17,365,172 bp
Band	11p15.1	End	17,389,331 bp

Gene location (Mouse)
Chr.	Chromosome 7 (mouse)
Band	7 B3|7 29.66 cM	Start	45,743,377 bp
Band	7 B3|7 29.66 cM	End	45,750,188 bp
RNA expression pattern
Bgee	Human / Mouse (ortholog); Top expressed in: gastrocnemius muscle; muscle of thigh; tibialis anterior muscle; right hemisphere of cerebellum; apex of heart; islet of Langerhans; right frontal lobe; prefrontal cortex; left ventricle; skeletal muscle tissue / Top expressed in: gastrula; muscle of thigh; medial ganglionic eminence; molar; calvaria; triceps brachii muscle; temporal muscle; ankle; intercostal muscle; major salivary gland; More reference expression data
BioGPS	n/a
Gene ontology
Molecular function	transmembrane transporter binding; potassium ion binding; voltage-gated ion channel activity; ankyrin binding; voltage-gated potassium channel activity; ATP-activated inward rectifier potassium channel activity; inward rectifier potassium channel activity; ATP binding; protein binding; protein C-terminus binding; heat shock protein binding
Cellular component	integral component of membrane; cytosol; endosome; nuclear envelope; membrane; intracellular membrane-bounded organelle; intercalated disc; cell body fiber; T-tubule; myelin sheath; plasma membrane; integral component of plasma membrane; soma; endoplasmic reticulum; mitochondrion; axolemma; inward rectifying potassium channel; sarcolemma; acrosomal vesicle
Biological process	positive regulation of cation channel activity; response to ATP; response to estradiol; negative regulation of insulin secretion; regulation of insulin secretion; response to testosterone; regulation of membrane potential; cellular response to tumor necrosis factor; regulation of ion transmembrane transport; nervous system process; cellular response to nicotine; ion transport; potassium ion transport; response to ischemia; potassium ion transmembrane transport; glucose metabolic process; cellular response to glucose stimulus; positive regulation of protein localization to plasma membrane; potassium ion import across plasma membrane; transmembrane transport; regulation of cardiac conduction
Sources:Amigo / QuickGO
Orthologs
Databases	NCBI: entry; OMA: entry
Species	Human	Mouse
Entrez	3767	16514
Ensembl	ENSG00000187486	ENSMUSG00000096146
UniProt	Q14654	Q61743
RefSeq (mRNA)	NM_000525; NM_001166290; NM_001377296; NM_001377297	NM_001204411; NM_010602
RefSeq (protein)	NP_000516; NP_001159762; NP_001364225; NP_001364226	NP_001191340; NP_034732
Location (UCSC)	Chr 11: 17.37 – 17.39 Mb	Chr 7: 45.74 – 45.75 Mb
PubMed search
- Wikidata
View/Edit Human	View/Edit Mouse

K_{ir}6.2 is a major subunit of the ATP-sensitive K^{+} channel, a lipid-gated inward-rectifier potassium ion channel. The gene encoding the channel is called KCNJ11 and mutations in this gene are associated with congenital hyperinsulinism.

== Structure ==
It is an integral membrane protein. The protein, which has a greater tendency to allow potassium to flow into a cell rather than out of a cell, is controlled by G-proteins and is found associated with the sulfonylurea receptor (SUR) to constitute the ATP-sensitive K^{+} channel.

== Pathology ==
Mutations in this gene are a cause of congenital hyperinsulinism (CHI), an autosomal recessive disorder characterized by unregulated insulin secretion. Defects in this gene may also contribute to autosomal dominant non-insulin-dependent diabetes mellitus type II (NIDDM).

== See also ==
- Inward-rectifier potassium ion channel
- Potassium channel
