= ABCC8 =

Protein-coding gene in the species Homo sapiens

Identifiers
- Aliases: ABCC8, ABC36, HHF1, HI, HRINS, MRP8, PHHI, SUR, SUR1, SUR1delta2, TNDM2, ATP binding cassette subfamily C member 8, PNDM3
- External IDs: OMIM: 600509; MGI: 1352629; GeneCards: ABCC8

Gene location (Human)
Chr.	Chromosome 11 (human)
Band	11p15.1	Start	17,392,498 bp
Band	11p15.1	End	17,476,894 bp

Gene location (Mouse)
Chr.	Chromosome 7 (mouse)
Band	7 B3|7 29.66 cM	Start	45,753,947 bp
Band	7 B3|7 29.66 cM	End	45,829,457 bp
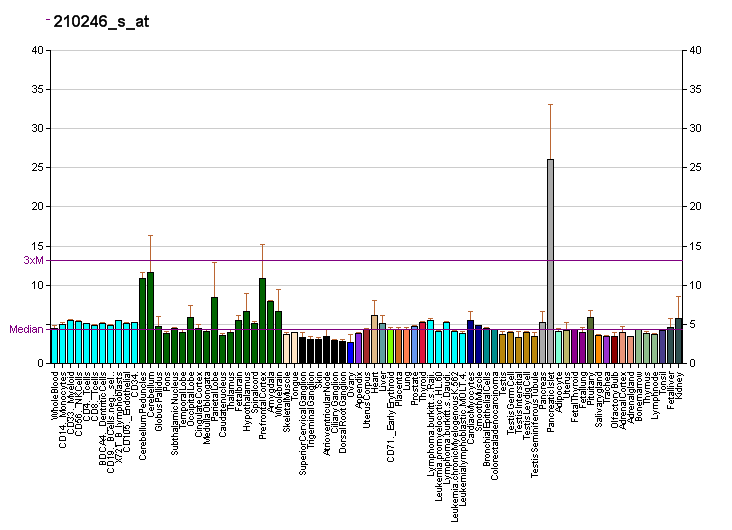
RNA expression pattern
Bgee	Human / Mouse (ortholog); Top expressed in: islet of Langerhans; right hemisphere of cerebellum; anterior pituitary; right frontal lobe; primary visual cortex; Brodmann area 9; cingulate gyrus; anterior cingulate cortex; middle temporal gyrus; sural nerve / Top expressed in: islet of Langerhans; cardiac muscle tissue of left ventricle; cerebellar cortex; lens; medial geniculate nucleus; lateral geniculate nucleus; medial dorsal nucleus; medial vestibular nucleus; deep cerebellar nuclei; primary visual cortex; More reference expression data
BioGPS	More reference expression data
Gene ontology
Molecular function	nucleotide binding; transmembrane transporter binding; sulfonylurea receptor activity; ATPase activity; ATP binding; ATP-activated inward rectifier potassium channel activity; ATPase-coupled transmembrane transporter activity; protein binding; potassium channel activity
Cellular component	integral component of membrane; membrane; plasma membrane; inward rectifying potassium channel; sarcolemma; mitochondrion; synaptic vesicle membrane
Biological process	regulation of insulin secretion; potassium ion transport; signal transduction; potassium ion transmembrane transport; transmembrane transport; cellular glucose homeostasis; female pregnancy; memory; visual learning; response to pH; response to zinc ion; negative regulation of low-density lipoprotein particle clearance; negative regulation of angiogenesis; response to lipopolysaccharide; positive regulation of tumor necrosis factor production; response to insulin; positive regulation of potassium ion transport; negative regulation of insulin secretion; negative regulation of neurogenesis; negative regulation of glial cell proliferation; negative regulation of wound healing; negative regulation of neuroblast migration; cellular response to organic substance; positive regulation of uterine smooth muscle relaxation; positive regulation of voltage-gated potassium channel activity; positive regulation of tight junction disassembly; negative regulation of blood-brain barrier permeability
Sources:Amigo / QuickGO
Orthologs
Databases	NCBI: entry; OMA: entry
Species	Human	Mouse
Entrez	6833	20927
Ensembl	ENSG00000006071	ENSMUSG00000040136
UniProt	Q09428	n/a
RefSeq (mRNA)	NM_000352; NM_001287174; NM_001351295; NM_001351296; NM_001351297	NM_011510; NM_001357538
RefSeq (protein)	NP_000343; NP_001274103; NP_001338224; NP_001338225; NP_001338226	n/a
Location (UCSC)	Chr 11: 17.39 – 17.48 Mb	Chr 7: 45.75 – 45.83 Mb
PubMed search
- Wikidata
View/Edit Human	View/Edit Mouse

ATP-binding cassette transporter sub-family C member 8 is a protein that in humans is encoded by the ABCC8 gene. ABCC8 orthologs have been identified in all mammals for which complete genome data are available.

The protein encoded by this gene is a member of the superfamily of ATP-binding cassette (ABC) transporters. ABC proteins transport various molecules across extra- and intra-cellular membranes. ABC genes are divided into seven distinct subfamilies (ABC1, MDR/TAP, MRP, ALD, OABP, GCN20, White). This protein is a member of the MRP subfamily which is involved in multi-drug resistance. This protein functions as a modulator of ATP-sensitive potassium channels and insulin release. Mutations and deficiencies in this protein have been observed in patients with hyperinsulinemic hypoglycemia of infancy, an autosomal recessive disorder of unregulated and high insulin secretion. Mutations have also been associated with non-insulin-dependent diabetes mellitus type II (neonatal diabetes), an autosomal dominant disease of defective insulin secretion, and congenital hyperinsulinism. Alternative splicing of this gene has been observed; however, the transcript variants have not been fully described.

== See also ==
- ATP-binding cassette transporter
- Sulfonylurea receptor
