= Pinacidil =

Names
- IUPAC name N-cyano-N'-pyridin-4-yl-N''-(1,2,2-trimethylpropyl)guanidine

Identifiers
| CAS Number | 60560-33-0 (anhydrous); 85371-64-8 (monohydrate) |
| 3D model (JSmol) | Interactive image |
| ChEMBL | ChEMBL1159; ChEMBL1200338 |
| ChemSpider | 4660 |
| ECHA InfoCard | 100.056.614 |
| IUPHAR/BPS | 2412 |
| PubChem CID | 4826 |
| UNII | BB4UGO5K0D (anhydrous); 7B0ZZH8P2W (monohydrate) |
| CompTox Dashboard (EPA) | DTXSID7048249 |
- InChI: InChI=1S/C13H19N5/c1-10(13(2,3)4)17-12(16-9-14)18-11-5-7-15-8-6-11/h5-8,10H,1-4H3,(H2,15,16,17,18) Key: IVVNZDGDKPTYHK-UHFFFAOYSA-N; InChI=1/C13H19N5/c1-10(13(2,3)4)17-12(16-9-14)18-11-5-7-15-8-6-11/h5-8,10H,1-4H3,(H2,15,16,17,18) Key: IVVNZDGDKPTYHK-UHFFFAOYAY
- SMILES: CC(C(C)(C)C)N=C(NC#N)NC1=CC=NC=C1

Properties
| Chemical formula | C_{13}H_{19}N_{5} |
| Molar mass | 245.32346 |

Pharmacology
| ATC code | C02DG01 (WHO) |
- Except where otherwise noted, data are given for materials in their standard state (at 25 °C [77 °F], 100 kPa). verify (what is ?) Infobox references

Pinacidil is a cyanoguanidine drug that opens ATP-sensitive potassium channels producing peripheral vasodilatation of arterioles. It reduces blood pressure and peripheral resistance and produces fluid retention.

Pinacidil has been associated with development of hypertrichosis in 2 to 13% of patients.

== Synthesis ==
Thieme Synthesis: Patents:

Condensation of 4-isothiocyanotopyridine [76105-84-5] (1) and 3,3-dimethyl-2-butanamine [3850-30-4] (2) gives thiourea [67027-06-9] (3). Treatment of that intermediate with a mixture of triphenylphosphine, carbon tetrachloride, and triethylamine leads to the unsymmetrical carbodiimide, CID:20501933 (4'). Addition of cyanamid affords pinacidil (5).
