= KCNJ8 =

Protein-coding gene in humans

Identifiers
- Aliases: KCNJ8, KIR6.1, uKATP-1, potassium voltage-gated channel subfamily J member 8, potassium inwardly rectifying channel subfamily J member 8
- External IDs: OMIM: 600935; MGI: 1100508; GeneCards: KCNJ8

Gene location (Human)
Chr.	Chromosome 12 (human)
Band	12p12.1	Start	21,764,955 bp
Band	12p12.1	End	21,775,600 bp

Gene location (Mouse)
Chr.	Chromosome 6 (mouse)
Band	6 G2|6 74.31 cM	Start	142,510,563 bp
Band	6 G2|6 74.31 cM	End	142,517,340 bp
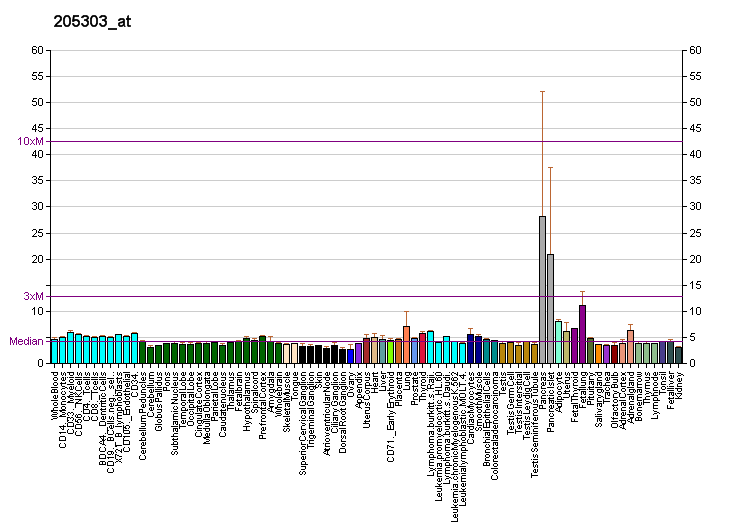

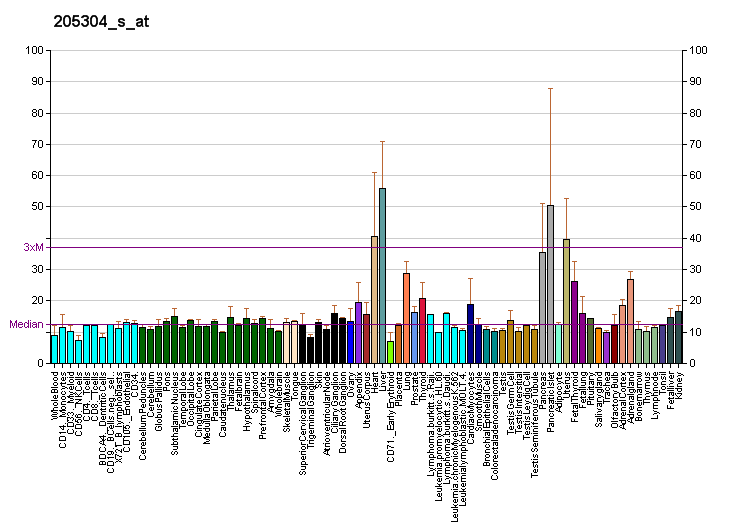
RNA expression pattern
Bgee	Human / Mouse (ortholog); Top expressed in: right ventricle; myocardium of left ventricle; apex of heart; body of pancreas; right lobe of liver; right auricle of heart; gastric mucosa; pericardium; subcutaneous adipose tissue; visceral pleura / Top expressed in: internal carotid artery; ascending aorta; molar; aortic valve; myocardium of ventricle; migratory enteric neural crest cell; digastric muscle; cardiac muscles; external carotid artery; interventricular septum; More reference expression data
BioGPS	More reference expression data
Gene ontology
Molecular function	voltage-gated ion channel activity; ATP binding; inward rectifier potassium channel activity; voltage-gated potassium channel activity involved in ventricular cardiac muscle cell action potential repolarization; ATP-activated inward rectifier potassium channel activity; sulfonylurea receptor binding
Cellular component	integral component of membrane; membrane; intracellular membrane-bounded organelle; voltage-gated potassium channel complex; plasma membrane; myofibril; mitochondrion; inward rectifying potassium channel; sarcolemma
Biological process	response to exogenous dsRNA; kidney development; regulation of ion transmembrane transport; ion transport; development of the heart; response to lipopolysaccharide; defense response to virus; potassium ion transport; membrane repolarization during ventricular cardiac muscle cell action potential; potassium ion import across plasma membrane; ion transmembrane transport; potassium ion transmembrane transport
Sources:Amigo / QuickGO
Orthologs
Databases	NCBI: entry; OMA: entry
Species	Human	Mouse
Entrez	3764	16523
Ensembl	ENSG00000121361	ENSMUSG00000030247
UniProt	Q15842	P97794
RefSeq (mRNA)	NM_004982	NM_008428; NM_001330363; NM_001330366
RefSeq (protein)	NP_004973	NP_001317292; NP_001317295; NP_032454
Location (UCSC)	Chr 12: 21.76 – 21.78 Mb	Chr 6: 142.51 – 142.52 Mb
PubMed search
- Wikidata
View/Edit Human	View/Edit Mouse

Potassium inwardly-rectifying channel, subfamily J, member 8, also known as KCNJ8, is a human gene encoding the K_{ir}6.1 protein. A mutation in KCNJ8 has been associated with cardiac arrest in the early repolarization syndrome.

Potassium channels are present in most mammalian cells, where they participate in a wide range of physiologic responses. K_{ir}6.1 is an integral membrane protein and inward-rectifier type potassium channel. K_{ir}6.1, which has a greater tendency to allow potassium to flow into a cell rather than out of a cell, is controlled by G-proteins.

== See also ==
- Inward-rectifier potassium ion channel
