= List of investigational hair loss drugs =

Investigational hair loss drugs

This is a list of investigational hair loss drugs, or drugs that are currently under development for clinical use in the treatment of different forms of alopecia (hair loss), such as androgenetic alopecia (pattern hair loss) and alopecia areata (spot baldness), but are not yet approved.

Chemical/generic names are listed first, with developmental code names, synonyms, and brand names in parentheses. The format of list items is "Name (Synonyms) – Route – Indication – Mechanism of Action [Reference]".

This list was last comprehensively updated in July 2025. It is likely to become outdated with time.

== Under development ==
=== Preregistration ===
- Coacillium (LH-8) – topical, other routes – alopecia areata, alopecia – various mechanisms of action
- Gecaxitinib (gecacitinib, jaktinib) – oral – alopecia areata – ACVR1 protein inhibitor, Janus kinase 1 inhibitor, Janus kinase 2 inhibitor, Janus kinase 3 inhibitor, TYK2 kinase inhibitor
- Ivarmacitinib (ARQ-252, ARQ-255, SHR-0302) – oral – alopecia areata – Janus kinase 1 inhibitor

=== Phase 3 ===
- AB-103 – topical – alopecia – minoxidil sulfotransferase stimulant (adjunct to minoxidil)
- Clascoterone (Breezula, Winlevi; CB-03-01) – topical – alopecia – androgen receptor antagonist
- Diphencyprone (diphenylcyclopropenone, samcyprone) – topical – alopecia areata – immunomodulator
- Dutasteride (AD-208) – oral – alopecia – 5α-reductase inhibitor
- Minoxidil oral extended-release (VDPHL01, VDPHL-01, VDPHL) – oral – alopecia, male pattern baldness – potassium channel opener (prodrug of minoxidil sulfate)
- Minoxidil sublingual (SLM) – sublingual – alopecia – potassium channel opener (prodrug of minoxidil sulfate)
- Pyrilutamide (EX-A5504, HY-145451, KX 826) – topical – alopecia – androgen receptor antagonist
- Upadacitinib (Rinvoq; ABT-494) – oral – alopecia areata – Janus kinase 1 inhibitor

=== Phase 2/3 ===
- Dalosirvat (SM-04554) – topical – alopecia – Wnt signalling pathway stimulant
- Suvomipic (PP405; PP-405; JXL069; JXL-069) – topical – alopecia – mitochondrial pyruvate carrier (MPC) inhibitor

=== Phase 2 ===
- Abatacept (Orencia) – injection – alopecia areata – T cell activation inhibitor
- Amlitelimab (KY-1005, SAR-445229) – subcutaneous injection – alopecia areata – OX40 ligand inhibitor
- BAY-1158061 (HMI-115) – subcutaneous injection – alopecia – prolactin receptor monoclonal antibody (prolactin receptor inhibitor)
- Bempikibart (ADX-914, BMS-986265) – subcutaneous injection – alopecia areata – CRLF2 protein antagonist, interleukin 7 receptor α subunit inhibitor
- Bimatoprost (Lumigan) – topical – alopecia – prostaglandin F receptor agonist (prostaglandin F_{2α} analogue)
- Botulinum toxin A (Xeomin; incobotulinum toxin A) – intradermal – alopecia – acetylcholine release inhibitor and neuromuscular blocking agent
- CKD-498 – oral – alopecia – undefined mechanism of action
- Daxdilimab (HZN-7734; MEDI-7734; VIB-7734) – oral – alopecia areata – anti-ILT7 human monoclonal antibody/dendritic cell inhibitor
- Delgocitinib (Anzupgo, Corectim; JTE-052, LEO-124249, LP-0133) – unknown – alopecia areata – Janus kinase inhibitor
- Deucravacitinib (Sotyktu; BMS-986165) – oral – alopecia areata – TYK2 kinase inhibitor
- Finasteride/latanoprost/minoxidil (TH-07; Triple Hair) – topical – alopecia – combination drug/multiple mechanisms of action
- FOL-005 (osteopontin-derived peptide) – intradermal – alopecia – undefined mechanism of action
- GT-20029 (AR-PROTAC) – topical – alopecia – androgen receptor degradation enhancer
- KL-130008 – oral – alopecia areata – Janus kinase inhibitor
- Latanoprost (DLQ01; DLQ-01) – topical – androgenic alopecia – prostaglandin F receptor agonist (prostaglandin F_{2α} analogue)
- NXC-736 – oral – alopecia areata – sphingosine 1 phosphate receptor antagonist
- Rezpegaldesleukin (Rezpeg; LY-3471851, NKTR-358) – unknown – alopecia areata – interleukin-2 conjugate/modulator
- RK-023 (nobiprostolan) – topical – alopecia, hypotrichosis – undefined mechanism of action (prostaglandin F_{2α} analogue)
- Rosnilimab (ANB-030) – subcutaneous injection – alopecia areata – programmed cell death 1 receptor agonist
- Ruxolitinib (Jakafi, Jakavi, Opzelura; INCB-018424) – topical – alopecia areata – Janus kinase 1 inhibitor, Janus kinase 2 inhibitor
- SIS-302-AA – unspecified – alopecia areata – undefined mechanism of action
- SYHX-1901 – oral – alopecia areata – Janus kinase inhibitor, Syk kinase inhibitor
- TDM-105795 (CU-40101) – topical – alopecia – thyroid hormone receptor agonist

=== Phase 1/2 ===
- ABS-201 – subcutaneous injection – alopecia – prolactin receptor monoclonal antibody
- Finasteride (IVL-3001, IVL-3002) – long-acting injection – alopecia – 5α-reductase inhibitor
- Finasteride (DA-4001, DA-4001C) – topical – alopecia – 5α-reductase inhibitor
- IMG-007 (HMPL-A28) – intravenous injection – alopecia areata – OX40 receptor antagonist

=== Phase 1 ===
- AH-001 – topical – alopecia – ubiquitin-protein ligase expression stimulant
- AMP-303 – intradermal – alopecia – undefined mechanism of action (polysaccharide)
- CKD-843 – oral, injection – alopecia – undefined mechanism of action
- CKR-051 – transdermal – alopecia – CXXC5 protein inhibitor, Wnt signalling pathway stimulant
- DR-01 – parenteral – alopecia areata – antibody-dependent cell cytotoxicity, T lymphocyte stimulant
- ET-02 (RS-5441) – topical – alopecia, hair disorders – undefined mechanism of action (targets and restores hair follicle stem cells)
- FOL-100 – topical – alopecia – undefined mechanism of action
- OLX-72021 – intradermal injection – alopecia – RNA interference
- QY-201 – oral – alopecia areata – Janus kinase 1 inhibitor, TYK2 kinase inhibitor
- SCO-240 – oral – alopecia – somatostatin receptor 5 modulator
- Squaric acid dibutyl ester (SQX-770) – topical – alopecia areata – immunomodulator
- VDAA – topical – alopecia areata – undefined mechanism of action

=== Phase 0 ===
- Latanoprost/minoxidil (ANR-001.1) – topical – hypotrichosis – combination drug/multiple mechanisms of action

=== Preclinical ===
- AC-203 – unspecified – alopecia areata – cell death modulator
- ADA-308 – topical – alopecia – androgen receptor antagonist
- BMD-1141 (BMD-1341) – subcutaneous injection – alopecia – parathyroid hormone receptor agonist
- Crebankitug (ZB-168) – parenteral – alopecia areata – interleukin 7 receptor α subunit inhibitor, thymic stromal lymphopoietin inhibitor
- CS-12192 – oral – alopecia areata – Janus kinase 1 inhibitor, Janus kinase 3 inhibitor, TBK1 protein inhibitor
- ES-135 – parenteral – alopecia – fibroblast growth factor replacement
- FB-102 – unknown – alopecia areata – interleukin-2 receptor β subunit antagonist
- HCW-9302 – injection – alopecia areata – interleukin 2 replacement
- MAX-40070 (MAX-3) – topical – alopecia areata – Janus kinase inhibitor, TYK2 kinase inhibitor
- MEI-004 – unknown – alopecia – undefined mechanism of action
- Oxymetazoline (DA-020) – topical – alopecia – α_{1}-adrenergic receptor agonist
- Phenylephrine/synephrine/tyramine (DA-007) – topical – alopecia – combination of phenylephrine (α_{1}-adrenergic receptor agonist), synephrine (α_{1}-adrenergic receptor agonist), and tyramine (norepinephrine–dopamine releasing agent)
- YR-001 – topical – alopecia – ion channel antagonist

=== Research ===
- SP-16 (Serpin Peptide 16) – unspecified – alopecia areata – immunomodulator, LDL receptor agonist
- TRN-007 – unspecified – hair disorders – RNA interference

=== Phase unknown ===
- JV-HG1 – topical – hair disorders – undefined mechanism of action
- OMA-102 – oral – alopecia – undefined mechanism of action

== Not under development ==
=== Development suspended ===
- EQ-101 (BNZ132) – intravenous – alopecia areata – interleukin 15 receptor antagonist, interleukin 2 receptor antagonist, interleukin 9 receptor antagonist
- Research programme: SNA based alopecia therapeutics - Exicure/AbbVie – alopecia – gene expression modulators
- XCUR-17 – topical – alopecia – RNA interference

=== No development reported ===
- AB-101 (RJ-101) – topical – alopecia – undefined mechanism of action
- BRM-421 (GPN-00136, PDSP) – topical – alopecia – cell proliferation stimulant
- Dimethylcurcumin (ASC-J9, AJ-101) – topical – male pattern baldness – androgen receptor degradation enhancer
- Lepzacitinib (ATI-1777) – topical – alopecia areata – Janus kinase 1 inhibitor, Janus kinase 3 inhibitor
- PF-277343 – unspecified – alopecia – undefined mechanism of action
- Research programme: janus kinase inhibitors - Aclaris Therapeutics/ JAKPharm – unknown – alopecia areata – Janus kinase 3 inhibitors
- Research programme: skin diseases therapeutics - Quark Pharmaceuticals (QP-AL1; QP-AL2) – unknown – alopecia (chemotherapy-induced) – RNA interference
- Research programme: stem cell therapeutics - Histostem (Cirrhosis HMScs) – unknown – alopecia – cell replacement
- Synephrine (AB-102) – topical – alopecia – α_{1}-adrenergic receptor agonist
- Valproic acid (VPA spray) – topical – male pattern baldness – glycogen synthase kinase 3β inhibitor, Wnt signalling pathway stimulant

=== Discontinued ===
- AS-601811 – oral – male pattern baldness – 5α-reductase inhibitor
- ATI-501 (A-201; ATI-50001) – oral – alopecia areata – Janus kinase 1 inhibitor, Janus kinase 3 inhibitor
- Brepocitinib (PF-06700841) – oral – alopecia, alopecia areata – Janus kinase 1 inhibitor, TYK2 kinase inhibitor
- Cioteronel (CPC-10997; Cyoctol, X-Andron) – topical – alopecia – androgen receptor antagonist
- Diazoxide – topical – alopecia – potassium channel opener
- Denileukin diftitox (Lymphirtm, Ontak, Remitoro; LY-335348; DAB389 interleukin-2) – unknown – alopecia – protein synthesis inhibitor
- Epristeride (Aipuliete; ONO-9302, SKF-105657) – oral – alopecia – 5α-reductase inhibitor
- Etrasimod (Verespiti, Velspity; APD-334, PF-07915503) – oral – alopecia areata – sphingosine 1 phosphate receptor modulator
- Farudodstat (ASLAN-003, LAS-186323) – oral – alopecia areata – dihydroorotate dehydrogenase inhibitor
- HST-001 (HSC-660) – intradermal – alopecia – intercellular signalling peptide and protein replacement
- Ifidancitinib (A-301, ATI-50002, ATI-502) – topical – alopecia, alopecia areata – Janus kinase 1 inhibitor, Janus kinase 3 inhibitor
- MK-434 (MK-0434) – oral – alopecia – 5α-reductase inhibitor
- Naminidil (BMS-234303) – topical – alopecia – potassium channel opener
- NEOSH–101 – topical – alopecia – undefined mechanism of action
- P-1075 – unknown – alopecia – potassium channel opener
- Piliel – topical – alopecia – undefined mechanism of action
- Research programme: androgen receptor antagonists - Endoceutics (EM-4350, EM-6537) – unknown – male pattern baldness – androgen receptor antagonists
- Research programme: oligonucleotide therapeutics for alopecia - OliPass – unknown – alopecia – androgen receptor antagonists
- RU-58841 (PSK-3841, HMR-3841) – topical – alopecia – androgen receptor antagonist
- Secukinumab (Cosentyx) – injection – alopecia areata – IL17A protein inhibitor
- Setipiprant (ACT-129968, KYTH-105) – oral – alopecia – prostaglandin D_{2} receptor antagonist
- Timbetasin (thymosin β4) – unknown – alopecia – various mechanisms of action
- Tralokinumab (Adbry, Adtralza; CAT-354, LP-0162) – subcutaneous injection – alopecia areata – interleukin-13 inhibitor
- TU-2100 – topical – hair disorders – undefined mechanism of action
- Viprostol (CL-115347) – topical – alopecia – synthetic prostaglandin E_{2} analogue

== Clinically used drugs ==
=== Approved drugs ===
==== Potassium channel openers ====
- Minoxidil (Rogaine) – topical – alopecia – potassium channel opener (prodrug of minoxidil sulfate)

==== 5α-Reductase inhibitors ====
- Finasteride (Propecia) – oral – alopecia – 5α-reductase inhibitor
- Finasteride (Finjuve) – topical – alopecia – 5α-reductase inhibitor
- Dutasteride (Avodart) – oral – alopecia – 5α-reductase inhibitor

==== Androgen receptor antagonists ====
- Topilutamide (fluiridil; Eucapil) – topical – alopecia – androgen receptor antagonist

==== Immunomodulators ====
- Baricitinib (Olumiant) – oral – alopecia areata – Janus kinase 1 inhibitor, Janus kinase 2 inhibitors, TYK2 kinase inhibitor
- Deuruxolitinib (Leqselvi) – oral – alopecia areata – Janus kinase 1 inhibitor, Janus kinase 2 inhibitor
- Ritlecitinib (Litfulo) – oral – alopecia areata – Emt protein-tyrosine kinase inhibitor, Janus kinase 3 inhibitor

==== Others ====
- Alfatradiol (Avicis, Avixis, Ell-Cranell Alpha, Pantostin) – oral – alopecia – dual weak estrogen and 5α-reductase inhibitor
- Minoxidil/finasteride (MorrF) – topical – alopecia – combination of minoxidil (potassium channel opener) and finasteride (5α-reductase inhibitor)
- Nepidermin (Easyef; DWP-401) – topical – alopecia – recombinant human epidermal growth factor (rhEGF) or epidermal growth factor receptor (EGFR) agonist

=== Off-label drugs ===
- Low-dose oral minoxidil
- Oral antiandrogens (androgen receptor antagonists) (e.g., spironolactone, cyproterone acetate, flutamide, bicalutamide)
- Oral estrogens (e.g., ethinylestradiol, estradiol)
- Topical antiandrogens (androgen receptor antagonists) (e.g., spironolactone, ketoconazole)
- Corticosteroids – alopecia areata (e.g., triamcinolone, clobetasol, fluocinonide, mometasone)

== See also ==
- List of investigational drugs
- Management of hair loss
- List of investigational acne drugs
