= AB-103 =

Clinical data
- Other names: AB103
- Routes of administration: Topical
- Drug class: Minoxidil sulfotransferase stimulant

AB-103 is a minoxidil sulfotransferase stimulant which is under development for the treatment of alopecia (hair loss) as an adjunct to the hair loss drug minoxidil. It is used topically. The drug works by stimulating the enzyme SULT1A1 in hair follicles which converts minoxidil into its active form minoxidil sulfate and which has been found to predict minoxidil's clinical effectiveness. It was originated by Applied Biology and is under development by Safety Shot. As of February 2024, AB-103 is in phase 3 clinical trials for treatment of alopecia. It has been in this stage of development since at least April 2019, but there have been no more recent updates on its development since then. The chemical structure of AB-103 does not yet appear to have been disclosed.

== See also ==
- List of investigational hair loss drugs
