= ABS-201 =

Clinical data
- Other names: ABS201
- Routes of administration: Subcutaneous injection
- Drug class: Prolactin receptor monoclonal antibody
- ATC code: None

ABS-201 is an AI-designed monoclonal antibody against the prolactin receptor (PRLR) currently in Phase 1/2a clinical trial for the treatment of androgenic alopecia (pattern hair loss) and endometriosis. It is taken by subcutaneous injection. ABS-201 is a possible first-in-class drug with a novel mechanism of action in the potential treatment of hair loss. ABS-201 is under development by Absci.

It is believed that ABS-201 works by activating dormant hair follicles and causing them to move from the telogen phase to the anagen phase. In human ex vivo scalp model studies, ABS-201 stimulated hair regrowth, prolonged anagen phase, blocked catagen phase, inhibited telogen effluvium, and blocked hair from losing color. ABS-201 has been found to produce robust hair regrowth as compared with minoxidil in mice and balding macaques.

The clinical trial for ABS-201 is being overseen by prominent hair loss researcher Rodney Sinclair, one of the principal investigators in minoxidil clinical trials. The chemical structure of the drug does not yet appear to have been disclosed.

== See also ==
- List of investigational hair loss drugs
- BAY-1158061 (HMI-115)
- Suvomipic (PP405; JXL069) and ET-02 (RS-5441)
