= C18H12N2O2 =

The molecular formula C_{18}H_{12}N_{2}O_{2} (molar mass: 288.306 g/mol) may refer to:

- Xantocillin
- UK-5099
