= ET-02 =

Clinical data
- Other names: ET02; RS-5441; RS5441
- Routes of administration: Oral, topical
- Drug class: Undefined (but targets and restores hair follicle stem cells)

ET-02, also known as RS-5441, is a drug which is under development for the treatment of alopecia and hair disorders. It is taken orally or topical, with both routes being developed. The drug's exact mechanism of action has not yet been disclosed. In any case, it is said to target and restore hair follicle stem cells (HFSCs). ET-02 was originated by Renascience and is now under development by Eirion Therapeutics. As of July 2025, it is in phase 1 clinical trials for alopecia and no recent development has been reported for hair disorders. The drug was reported to promote significant hair growth after 4 weeks of treatment in humans in a phase 1 trial and to do so more rapidly than minoxidil. As with its mechanism of action, the chemical structure of ET-02 does not yet appear to have been disclosed.

== See also ==
- List of investigational hair loss drugs
- Suvomipic (PP405; JXL069) and ABS-201
