= JXL082 =

Clinical data
- Other names: JXL-082
- Drug class: Mitochondrial pyruvate carrier (MPC) inhibitor
- ATC code: None

Identifiers
- IUPAC name: ethyl (E)-3-[1-[[3,5-bis(trifluoromethyl)phenyl]methyl]pyrrolo[2,3-b]pyridin-3-yl]-2-cyanoprop-2-enoate
- CAS Number: 2260696-75-9
- PubChem CID: 137384919
- ChemSpider: 129515069
- ChEMBL: ChEMBL4746172

Chemical and physical data
- Formula: C_{22}H_{15}F_{6}N_{3}O_{2}
- Molar mass: 467.371 g·mol^{−1}
- 3D model (JSmol): Interactive image
- SMILES: CCOC(=O)/C(=C/C1=CN(C2=C1C=CC=N2)CC3=CC(=CC(=C3)C(F)(F)F)C(F)(F)F)/C#N
- InChI: InChI=1S/C22H15F6N3O2/c1-2-33-20(32)14(10-29)8-15-12-31(19-18(15)4-3-5-30-19)11-13-6-16(21(23,24)25)9-17(7-13)22(26,27)28/h3-9,12H,2,11H2,1H3/b14-8+; Key:AIPLDVOUZVHAOG-RIYZIHGNSA-N

JXL082, or JXL-082, is a drug acting as a mitochondrial pyruvate carrier (MPC) inhibitor which was synthesized towards the aim of developing a treatment for hair loss. It is related to other drugs in the same series such as suvomipic (PP405; JXL069) and UK-5099 (JXL001). The drug is known to have been sold online in a grey market fashion for treatment of hair loss. It has been mistakenly believed to be suvomipic in the past. JXL082 was first described in the scientific literature by 2019.

== See also ==
- List of investigational hair loss drugs
- Suvomipic (PP405; JXL069)
- UK-5099 (JXL001)
