= Suvomipic =

Clinical data
- Other names: PP-405; JXL069; JXL-069
- Routes of administration: Topical administration as a gel to the scalp
- Drug class: Mitochondrial pyruvate carrier (MPC) inhibitor; Indirect lactate dehydrogenase (LDH) stimulant

Identifiers
- IUPAC name: (E)-3-[1-[[3,5-bis(trifluoromethyl)phenyl]methyl]pyrrolo[2,3-b]pyridin-3-yl]-2-cyanoprop-2-enoic acid
- CAS Number: 2260696-63-5
- PubChem CID: 137374808
- ChemSpider: 123961728
- UNII: NPC95AG9EF
- ChEMBL: ChEMBL4779727

Chemical and physical data
- Formula: C_{20}H_{11}F_{6}N_{3}O_{2}
- Molar mass: 439.317 g·mol^{−1}
- 3D model (JSmol): Interactive image
- SMILES: C1=CC2=C(N=C1)N(C=C2/C=C(\C#N)/C(=O)O)CC3=CC(=CC(=C3)C(F)(F)F)C(F)(F)F
- InChI: InChI=1S/C20H11F6N3O2/c21-19(22,23)14-4-11(5-15(7-14)20(24,25)26)9-29-10-13(6-12(8-27)18(30)31)16-2-1-3-28-17(16)29/h1-7,10H,9H2,(H,30,31)/b12-6+; Key:IGVIZFSCSSEYDA-WUXMJOGZSA-N

Suvomipic (INN; developmental code names PP405 and JXL069) is a drug acting as a mitochondrial pyruvate carrier (MPC) inhibitor which is under development for the treatment of alopecia (hair loss), specifically androgenic alopecia (pattern hair loss). It is used topically as a 0.05% concentration gel on the scalp once-daily. Suvomipic is a possible first-in-class drug with a novel mechanism of action in the potential treatment of hair loss. The drug's generic name and chemical structure were published in July 2026, revealing PP405 to be the existing compound JXL069.

== Pharmacology ==
=== Pharmacodynamics ===
Suvomipic is listed as a dual mitochondrial pyruvate carrier (MPC) MPC1 and MPC2 inhibitor. It is thought to work by causing pyruvate accumulation, which in turn results in stimulation of lactate dehydrogenase (LDH) activity in hair follicle stem cells (HFSCs). As a result of this, lactic acid levels and glycolysis increase within the cells and more energy for cellular growth becomes available. It appears that changes in intracellular lactate availability may be a key mediator of the hair growth cycle, with low lactate levels resulting in dormancy or the telogen stage and high lactate levels resulting in active growth or the anagen stage. In the case of androgenic alopecia, hair follicles have miniaturized and permanently entered the telogen phase. According to its developers, suvomipic acts differently than existing hair loss drugs like minoxidil and finasteride in that it works via reactivating dormant hair follicles by altering HFSC metabolism. MPC inhibitors like UK-5099 (JXL001) and suvomipic have been found to stimulate hair growth in genetically modified mice in vivo and in excised human skin ex vivo. Another related approach to promoting hair growth is application of deoxyribose sugar gel, which was also effective in stimulating hair growth in mice.

=== Pharmacokinetics ===
Suvomipic is used topically on the scalp instead of orally for potential safety and tolerability reasons. As an example, MPCs and pyruvate availability also prominently regulate stem cells and cellular growth in the intestines. The drug is said to be unstable in blood, which limits the risk of systemic absorption and side effects. It is said to have been engineered to be 1,000 times more effective at "penetrating" skin than blood. No suvomipic was detected in circulation with topical administration to the scalp in clinical studies.

== Chemistry ==
The chemical structure of suvomipic was originally undisclosed for a time. The drug has been patented and its structure was initially said to be known only to Pelage Pharmaceuticals. The company has also patented and published on other MPC inhibitors such as JXL069 and JXL082. They are (E)-2-cyano-3-(1H-indol-3-yl)acrylic acids and related analogues. Suvomipic was said to be neither JXL069 nor JXL082. The drug-related properties of certain related MPC inhibitors like UK-5099 (JXL001) are said to be incompatible with therapeutic use. In July 2026, the INN of suvomipic was published and revealed it to in fact be JXL069.

== History ==
UK-5099 (JXL001), the earlier MPC inhibitor from which suvomipic was derived, was first described in the scientific literature by 1975. Suvomipic is under development by Pelage Pharmaceuticals. In 2025, it was reported that lab work on the drug had been ongoing for almost a decade. It originated at the University of California, Los Angeles (UCLA), with Pelage Pharmaceuticals being founded and spun out of UCLA in 2018 by three scientists at the university. These academics included Bill Lowry, Heather Christofk, and Michael Jung. The chief medical officer (CMO) of the company is Qing Yu Christina Weng. Pelage Pharmaceuticals was named after the French word for "coat of fur" and "PP405" was named after the company and the 405 freeway that goes through Los Angeles. The first human clinical trials of suvomipic started in 2023 in Orange County.

== Society and culture ==
=== Grey market use ===
Suvomipic has attracted an unusual amount of attention for an investigational drug, such as in the r/Tressless subreddit about hair loss on Reddit. A large group of r/Tressless members, having believed that JXL069 is suvomipic, are known to have sourced JXL069 from China in 2025 in an effort to treat their hair loss. This included sending a sample to an analytical testing lab to confirm the compound's authenticity. Pelage Pharmaceuticals says that it does not endorse such use and has explicitly stated that suvomipic is not JXL069. Suvomipic is also said to not be JXL082. In July 2026, the INN of suvomipic was published and revealed that suvomipic is in fact JXL069.

== Research ==
As of June 2025, suvomipic is in phase 2 clinical trials for treatment of alopecia. Two clinical trials have been completed, including a phase 1 trial and a phase 2a trial. There were initial concerns that suvomipic might actually kill all hair follicles rather than promote hair growth, but its developers were pleased to find that this was not the case.

The effectiveness data for a phase 2a trial was released in June 2025. In this preliminary trial, 31% of men with "advanced baldness" or "a higher degree of hair loss" experienced an increase in hair density of 20% or more at the 8-week follow-up point subsequent to 4 weeks of suvomipic treatment, whereas none of the men in the placebo group showed improvement. Existing hair-loss drugs like minoxidil and finasteride are said to require months to produce any visible difference. The new hair growth was described as not being vellus hair, peach fuzz, or baby hair, but as being proper and thick terminal hair, and to have grown in previously bald areas. However, Pelage Pharmaceuticals declined to share before-and-after photos, citing regulations preventing them from doing so. Moreover, the trial was a short-term study that was primarily designed to assess safety and not efficacy. A three-month open-label extension of the phase 2a trial was subsequently completed and these data will be shared in 2026. Pelage Pharmaceuticals presented on suvomipic at the American Academy of Dermatology (AAD) Annual Meeting 2026 in March 2026, including disclosing some new phase 2a trial data, but did not provide the open-label extension data at this event.

Phase 3 trials of suvomipic for alopecia are being planned for 2026. It has been estimated that if suvomipic is successful in clinical trials and passes regulatory scrutiny, the drug could be approved for the treatment of hair loss sometime between 2027 and 2029 at the earliest.

Suvomipic is currently Pelage Pharmaceuticals's only official drug candidate. However, the company is also investigating reactivation of dormant stem cells for treatment of other medical conditions. Pelage Pharmaceuticals had raised more than $30 million by August 2025, with investment being led by Google Ventures of Alphabet. In October 2025, it was announced that the company had raised $120 million. In 2019, Pelage Pharmaceuticals had reached an agreement that granted Allergan (now AbbVie) an option to acquire the startup company, but this deal was terminated in 2020.

Suvomipic may also have applications in the treatment of other forms of hair loss besides androgenic alopecia.

In October 2025, Time magazine named suvomipic one of the best inventions of 2025. However, the magazine also disclosed, via communication with Pelage Pharmaceuticals, that suvomipic may not be effective in the end stages of balding if the hair follicle is "scarred". In general, drugs like suvomipic are only thought to have potential effectiveness for a given follicle if it is still intact, undamaged, and merely dormant. Hair follicles are known to undergo progressive damage from low-grade microinflammation and reduced blood flow in androgenic alopecia, resulting not only in dormancy but also in perifollicular fibrosis and associated follicular miniaturization. In addition, in more advanced or later-stage cases, there can be arrector pili muscle detachment and micro-scarring. These sequelae are thought to limit the potential for follicular regeneration.

== See also ==
- List of investigational hair loss drugs
- ET-02 (RS-5441) and ABS-201
