= Dalosirvat =

Clinical data
- Other names: SM-04554; SM04554
- Routes of administration: Topical solution
- Drug class: Wnt signaling pathway stimulant
- ATC code: None

Identifiers
- IUPAC name: 1-(2,3-dihydro-1,4-benzodioxin-6-yl)-4-phenylbutane-1,4-dione
- CAS Number: 1360540-81-3
- PubChem CID: 56837361
- DrugBank: DB18960
- UNII: QX6T87A52I
- ChEMBL: ChEMBL4650339

Chemical and physical data
- Formula: C_{18}H_{16}O_{4}
- Molar mass: 296.322 g·mol^{−1}
- 3D model (JSmol): Interactive image
- SMILES: C1COC2=C(O1)C=CC(=C2)C(=O)CCC(=O)C3=CC=CC=C3
- InChI: InChI=1S/C18H16O4/c19-15(13-4-2-1-3-5-13)7-8-16(20)14-6-9-17-18(12-14)22-11-10-21-17/h1-6,9,12H,7-8,10-11H2; Key:AOCDRSSVFUCURK-UHFFFAOYSA-N

Dalosirvat (INN, USAN; developmental code name SM-04554) is a drug acting as a Wnt signaling pathway stimulant which is under development for the treatment of alopecia (hair loss). It is used topically as a solution. The drug is being developed by Biosplice Therapeutics (formerly known as Samumed). As of April 2021, it is in phase 2/3 clinical trials for this in Turkey. There have been no further updates on the development of dalosirvat as of October 2025. Two phase 2 trials have been completed and preliminary results released. In one of the trials, only a 0.15% concentration and not a higher 0.25% concentration showed effectiveness. A 625-patient phase 3 trial was reportedly started in 2018. It was reported in a 2023 literature review that dalosirvat had completed a phase 3 trial in early 2023 and that Biosplice Therapeutics had cancelled its development based on the trial's results.

== See also ==
- List of investigational hair loss drugs
