= BAY-1158061 =

Clinical data
- Other names: BAY1158061; HMI-115; HMI115
- Routes of administration: Subcutaneous injection
- Drug class: Prolactin receptor monoclonal antibody
- ATC code: None

Pharmacokinetic data
- Elimination half-life: 9–16 days

BAY-1158061, also known as HMI-115, is a monoclonal antibody against the prolactin receptor (PRLR) which is under development for the treatment of alopecia and endometriosis. It is taken by long-lasting subcutaneous injection. BAY-1158061 has been reported to promote hair growth in balding stump-tailed macaques. The drug was first described in the scientific literature by 2018. It is under development by Bayer and Hope Medicine. As of June 2025, BAY-1158061 is in phase 2 clinical trials for alopecia and endometriosis. Multiple phase 2 trials have been completed, including trials for both alopecia and endometriosis. The chemical structure of BAY-1158061 does not yet appear to have been disclosed.

== See also ==
- List of investigational hair loss drugs
- ABS-201
