= Viprostol =

Clinical data
- Other names: CL-115347; CL115347; CL-115,347; 15-(Deoxy)-16-hydroxy-16-vinylprostaglandin E2 methyl ester; 15-Deoxy-16-hydroxy-16-vinyl-PGE2 methyl ester; DHV-PGE2Me
- Routes of administration: Topical
- Drug class: Prostaglandin E2 analogue
- ATC code: None

Identifiers
- IUPAC name: methyl (Z)-7-[(1R,2R,3R)-2-[(E)-4-ethenyl-4-hydroxyoct-1-enyl]-3-hydroxy-5-oxocyclopentyl]hept-5-enoate
- CAS Number: 73621-92-8 73647-73-1
- PubChem CID: 6438370
- ChemSpider: 4942852
- UNII: O2Y6I4Y8TF
- KEGG: D06310
- ChEBI: CHEBI:231014
- ChEMBL: ChEMBL2107669
- CompTox Dashboard (EPA): DTXSID301021620

Chemical and physical data
- Formula: C_{23}H_{36}O_{5}
- Molar mass: 392.536 g·mol^{−1}
- 3D model (JSmol): Interactive image
- SMILES: CCCCC(C/C=C/[C@H]1[C@@H](CC(=O)[C@@H]1C/C=C\CCCC(=O)OC)O)(C=C)O
- InChI: InChI=1S/C23H36O5/c1-4-6-15-23(27,5-2)16-11-13-19-18(20(24)17-21(19)25)12-9-7-8-10-14-22(26)28-3/h5,7,9,11,13,18-19,21,25,27H,2,4,6,8,10,12,14-17H2,1,3H3/b9-7-,13-11+/t18-,19-,21-,23?/m1/s1; Key:TWCQWABAGCMHLL-ROVQGQOSSA-N

Viprostol (INN, USAN, BAN; developmental code name CL-115347) is a synthetic prostaglandin E2 (PGE_{2}) analogue which was under development for the treatment of alopecia (hair loss) but was never marketed. It is administered topically and was found to increase scalp hair growth in people with alopecia, albeit with mixed evidence of effectiveness. The drug was under development by American Cyanamid. It reached phase 3 clinical trials for treatment of alopecia in the 1980s, but development was discontinued due to inadequate effectiveness. Viprostol is also a vasodilator and was originally developed for the treatment of hypertension in the mid-1970s before being repurposed for alopecia.

== See also ==
- List of investigational hair loss drugs
