= Mitochondrial pyruvate carrier =

The mitochondrial pyruvate carriers are composed of:

- Mitochondrial pyruvate carrier 1
- Mitochondrial pyruvate carrier 2

The pyruvate carriers are involved in mitochondrial metabolism but it is possible to compensate for their loss of function. They have been studied for a role in cardiac stress adaption.

== Inhibitors ==
MPC inhibitors include drugs like UK-5099 (JXL001), suvomipic (PP405; JXL069), and JXL082.
