= Minoxidil sulfate =

Chemical compound

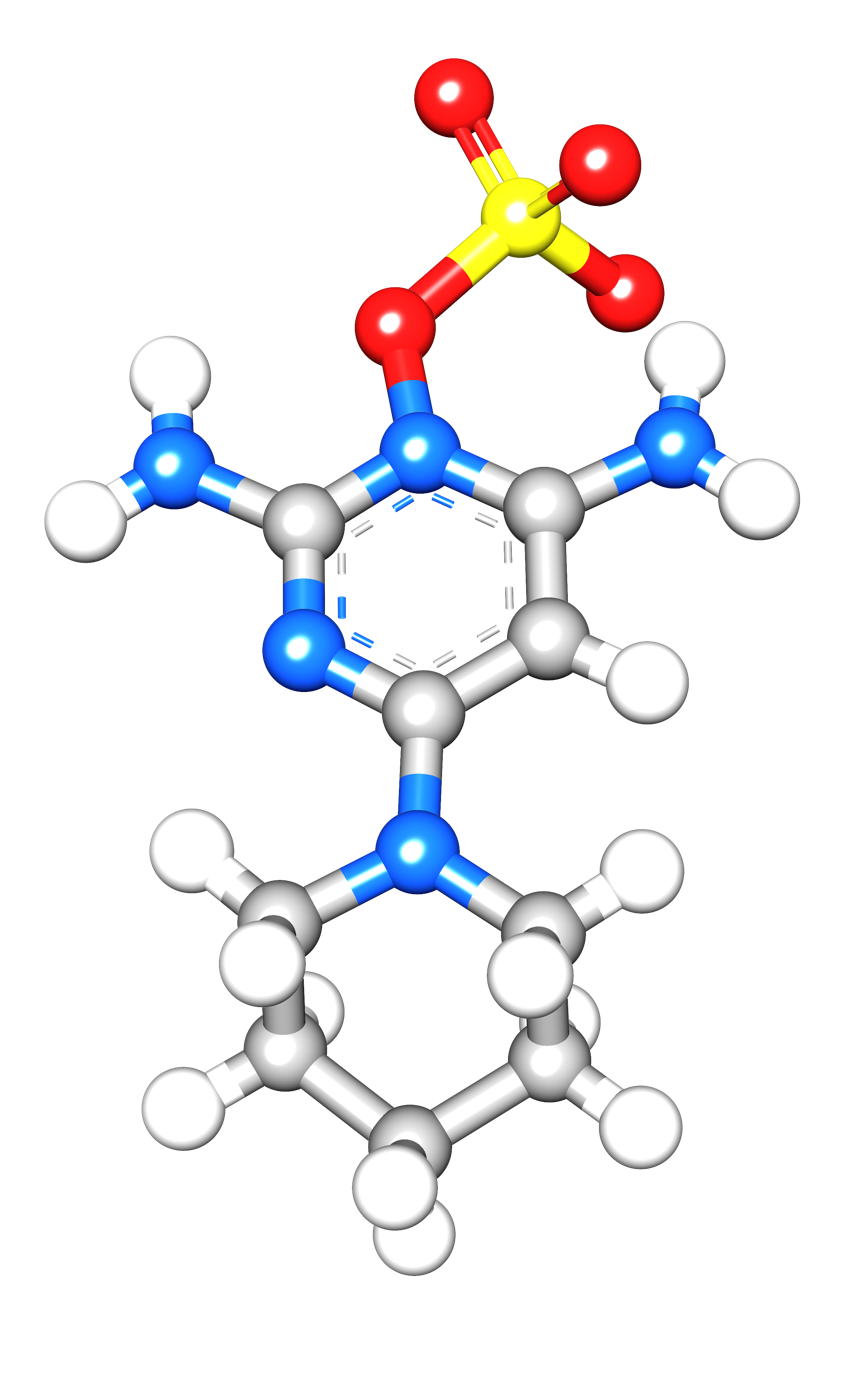

Clinical data
- Other names: Minoxidil sulphate; Minoxidil sulfate ester; Minoxidil sulphate ester; Minoxidil N-O-sulfate; Minoxidil N-O-sulphate; U-58838

Identifiers
- IUPAC name: (2,6-diamino-4-piperidin-1-ylpyrimidin-1-ium-1-yl) sulfate
- CAS Number: 83701-22-8
- PubChem CID: 4202
- ChemSpider: 4057
- UNII: 2H6K6Y231J
- ChEBI: CHEBI:143426
- ChEMBL: ChEMBL906
- ECHA InfoCard: 100.163.834

Chemical and physical data
- Formula: C_{9}H_{15}N_{5}O_{4}S
- Molar mass: 289.31 g·mol^{−1}
- 3D model (JSmol): Interactive image
- SMILES: C1CCN(CC1)C2=NC(=[N+](C(=C2)N)OS(=O)(=O)[O-])N
- InChI: InChI=1S/C9H15N5O4S/c10-7-6-8(13-4-2-1-3-5-13)12-9(11)14(7)18-19(15,16)17/h6H,1-5H2,(H4,10,11,12,15,16,17); Key:OEOLOEUAGSPDLT-UHFFFAOYSA-N

Minoxidil sulfate, also known as minoxidil sulfate ester or minoxidil N-O-sulfate, is an active metabolite of minoxidil and is the active form of this agent. Minoxidil acts as a prodrug of minoxidil sulfate. Minoxidil sulfate is formed from minoxidil via sulfotransferase enzymes, with the predominant enzyme responsible, at least in hair follicles, being SULT1A1. Minoxidil sulfate acts as a potassium channel opener, among other actions, and has vasodilating, hypotensive, and trichogenic or hypertrichotic (hair growth-promoting) effects. Its mechanism of action in terms of hair growth is still unknown, although multiple potential mechanisms have been implicated.

Minoxidil sulfate is a sulfate ester of minoxidil, not a sulfate salt of the compound. However, minoxidil sulfate forms an inner salt, which makes it more hydrophobic than minoxidil. This is in contrast to most sulfate esters, which are usually more hydrophilic than their non-ester forms. The bioactivation of minoxidil into minoxidil sulfate is very unusual and is among the only known instances of sulfation producing a more active drug form. Normally, sulfation tends to inactivate drugs by reducing their biological activity and increasing their excretion.

Minoxidil sulfate is highly unstable in aqueous solutions and alcohol-containing solvents, with a half-life of 6 hours in aqueous solutions and a further much lower half-life in alcohol-containing solvents. This has served as a limiting factor in its potential pharmaceutical use and therapeutic effectiveness. Moreover, minoxidil sulfate has a 40% higher molecular weight than minoxidil, and this may reduce its absorption into the scalp. In any case, a minoxidil sulfate-based topical formulation has been investigated for the treatment of scalp hair loss. Additionally, minoxidil-sulfate-based topical formulations appear to be available for medical use in some parts of the world, for instance in Brazil.

== See also ==
- List of investigational hair loss drugs
- ATP-sensitive potassium channel § Stimulation of hair growth
