= UK-5099 =

Clinical data
- Other names: UK5099; JXL001; JXL-001; 2-Cyano-3-(1-phenylindol-3-yl)acrylate; 2-CPIYA
- Drug class: Mitochondrial pyruvate carrier (MPC) inhibitor
- ATC code: None

Identifiers
- IUPAC name: (E)-2-cyano-3-(1-phenylindol-3-yl)prop-2-enoic acid
- CAS Number: 56396-35-1
- PubChem CID: 6438504
- ChemSpider: 4942974
- ChEBI: CHEBI:232354
- ChEMBL: ChEMBL4303684
- ECHA InfoCard: 100.221.617

Chemical and physical data
- Formula: C_{18}H_{12}N_{2}O_{2}
- Molar mass: 288.306 g·mol^{−1}
- 3D model (JSmol): Interactive image
- SMILES: C1=CC=C(C=C1)N2C=C(C3=CC=CC=C32)/C=C(\C#N)/C(=O)O
- InChI: InChI=1S/C18H12N2O2/c19-11-13(18(21)22)10-14-12-20(15-6-2-1-3-7-15)17-9-5-4-8-16(14)17/h1-10,12H,(H,21,22)/b13-10+; Key:BIZNHCWFGNKBBZ-JLHYYAGUSA-N

UK-5099, also known as JXL001 or as 2-cyano-3-(1-phenylindol-3-yl)acrylate (2-CPIYA), is a mitochondrial pyruvate carrier (MPC) inhibitor. It has been found to promote hair growth when administered topically to the skin in rodents. The drug was first described in the scientific literature by at least 1975. Analogues of UK-5099 like suvomipic (PP405; JXL069) and JXL082 have been developed.

== See also ==
- List of investigational hair loss drugs
