= Minoxidil/finasteride =

- Minoxidil

- Finasteride

Combination of
- Minoxidil: Potassium channel opener
- Finasteride: 5α-Reductase inhibitor

Clinical data
- Trade names: MorrF; Morr F
- Other names: Finasteride/minoxidil
- Routes of administration: Topical
- Drug class: Hair loss medication

Minoxidil/finasteride, or finasteride/minoxidil, sold under the brand name MorrF or Morr F, is a combination of the K_{ATP} potassium channel opener minoxidil and the 5α-reductase inhibitor finasteride which is approved and used in the treatment of alopecia (hair loss) in India. It is used topically. The drug was developed by Intas Pharmaceuticals and Jina Pharmaceuticals and was introduced in 2015.
