= Prolactin receptor =

Type I cytokine receptor and coding gene in humans

PRLR
Available structures
PDB	Ortholog search: PDBe RCSB
PDB	List of PDB id codes 2LFG, 3NCF, 3N0P, 3NCC, 3N06, 3NCB, 4I18, 3MZG, 3NCE, 1BP3, 3D48, 2N7I

Identifiers
- Aliases: PRLR, HPRL, RI-prolactin receptor, MFAB, hPRLrI, Prolactin receptor, IPR033230
- External IDs: OMIM: 176761; MGI: 97763; HomoloGene: 733; GeneCards: PRLR; OMA:PRLR - orthologs

Gene location (Human)
Chr.	Chromosome 5 (human)
Band	5p13.2	Start	35,048,756 bp
Band	5p13.2	End	35,230,487 bp

Gene location (Mouse)
Chr.	Chromosome 15 (mouse)
Band	15 A1|15 5.23 cM	Start	10,177,324 bp
Band	15 A1|15 5.23 cM	End	10,349,266 bp
RNA expression pattern
Bgee	Human / Mouse (ortholog); Top expressed in: placenta; Epithelium of choroid plexus; seminal vesicula; canal of the cervix; decidua; left adrenal gland; jejunal mucosa; right adrenal cortex; left adrenal cortex; ectocervix / Top expressed in: Epithelium of choroid plexus; choroid plexus of fourth ventricle; seminal vesicula; islet of Langerhans; zygote; lactiferous gland; secondary oocyte; jejunum; intestinal villus; epithelium of small intestine; More reference expression data
BioGPS	n/a
Gene ontology
Molecular function	ornithine decarboxylase activator activity; protein homodimerization activity; metal ion binding; peptide hormone binding; protein binding; cytokine receptor activity; prolactin receptor activity; cytokine binding
Cellular component	integral component of membrane; membrane; plasma membrane; endosome lumen; extracellular region; cell surface; external side of plasma membrane; receptor complex
Biological process	growth hormone receptor signaling pathway via JAK-STAT; negative regulation of apoptotic process; cell surface receptor signaling pathway; activation of transmembrane receptor protein tyrosine kinase activity; prolactin signaling pathway; embryo implantation; T cell activation; steroid biosynthetic process; activation of Janus kinase activity; lactation; positive regulation of cold-induced thermogenesis
Sources:Amigo / QuickGO
Orthologs
Species	Human	Mouse
Entrez	5618	19116
Ensembl	ENSG00000113494	ENSMUSG00000005268
UniProt	P16471	Q08501
RefSeq (mRNA)	NM_000949; NM_001204314; NM_001204315; NM_001204316; NM_001204317 NM_001204318	NM_001253781; NM_001253782; NM_011169
RefSeq (protein)	NP_000940; NP_001191243; NP_001191244; NP_001191245; NP_001191246 NP_001191247	NP_001240710; NP_001240711; NP_035299
Location (UCSC)	Chr 5: 35.05 – 35.23 Mb	Chr 15: 10.18 – 10.35 Mb
PubMed search
- Wikidata
View/Edit Human	View/Edit Mouse

Prolactin Receptor

Identifiers
- Symbol: PRLR
- NCBI gene: 5618
- HGNC: 9446
- OMIM: 176761
- PDB: 1RW5
- RefSeq: NM_000949
- UniProt: P16471

Other data
- Locus: Chr. 5 p13-p12
Search for
- Structures: Swiss-model
- Domains: InterPro

The prolactin receptor (PRLR) is a type I cytokine receptor encoded in humans by the PRLR gene on chromosome 5p13-14. It is the receptor for prolactin (PRL). The PRLR can also bind to and be activated by growth hormone (GH) and human placental lactogen (hPL). The PRLR is expressed in the mammary glands, pituitary gland, and other tissues. It plays an important role in lobuloalveolar development of the mammary glands during pregnancy and in lactation.

== Structure ==
The prolactin receptor (PRLR) is a membrane-bound protein of the cytokine receptor superfamily. In humans, it is encoded by a single gene that contains 11 exons and is located on chromosome 5. PRLR expression can be found in several tissues such as the gonads, breast, uterus, heart, liver, kidney, brain, immune cells, as well as adrenal and pituitary glands.

Several PRLR isoforms have been described in different tissues. These have varying lengths and cytoplasmic domain composition, but share identical extracellular domains, which are the regions binding to PRLR.

Diversity of PRLR is a result of transcription initiation in different sites of the PRLR promoter region. Additionally, post-translational modifications, like alternative splicing are the events that result in the different isoforms that allow for all the different actions of prolactin in the body.

== Signaling ==
The PRLR is a class 1 cytokine receptor that uses messenger pathways to control cell proliferation, migration, intracellular ion concentration and inhibit programmed cell death (apoptosis). PRLRs also have functions in the second messenger cascades, including:

- JAK-STAT pathway – the STAT protein family has been shown to have a key transduction role in cytokine receptor signalling; this pathway is initiated following the activation of PRLRs. Although there have been 4 STAT proteins identified as transducer molecules of PRLR, STAT5 is recognised as the most important transducer of PRLR isoforms, with a role in inhibiting the regulation of gene transcription.
- Ras-Raf-MAPK – initiated by PRLR activation. Phosphotyrosine residues on PRLR act as binding sites for adapter proteins – these connect PRLR to the Ras/Raf/MAP kinase cascade
- JAK-RUSH pathway
- PI3K/AKT/mTOR pathway

== Function ==
Expression of the PRLR protein is found within cells of the mammary glands in accordance with its role in lactation, but also is the subject of attention for its diverse and emerging roles by its expression in adipose tissue, pancreatic islet cell proliferation, and immune responses. The PRLR it essential for lobuloalveolar maturation of the mammary glands during pregnancy, as evidenced by the fact that PRLR knockout mice show severely impaired development of lobuloalveolar structures. Disruption of PRLR signaling pathways has been linked to tumorigenesis and breast cancer development.

== Ligands ==
=== Agonists ===
- Prolactin
- Growth hormone
- Human placental lactogen
- Placental growth hormone
- S179D-hPRL

=== Antagonists ===
Prolactin receptor antagonists such as Del1-9-G129R-hPRL have been developed.

Dopamine agonists are currently the most common method used for treating hyperprolactinemia. However, since dopamine agonists only negatively regulate prolactin production from the pituitary gland, a few studies have tried to develop prolactin receptor antagonists for potentially treating the dopamine-resistant local hyperprolactinemia. Δ1–9-G129R-hPRL is one of the prolactin receptor antagonists been studied. Δ1–9-G129R-hPRL as a mutant (inactivated) form of prolactin which exerts its antagonist effect by competing with prolactin to bind with prolactin receptors; thereby, inhibiting the agonist effects of prolactin on prolactin receptors. Besides molecular antagonists, antibodies can also potentially be used to inhibit prolactin receptor signaling. LFA102 is a monoclonal antibody that has been studied and tested for disrupting prolactin receptor's signaling in breast cancers and prostate cancers. Although LFA102 has been proven sufficient to reduce prolactin receptor signaling based on in vitro and in vivo (mouse) studies, LFA102 likely has low effects on limiting tumor growth (breast and prostate cancer) as shown in phase I clinical trials.

=== Monoclonal antibodies ===
- ABS-201
- BAY-1158061 (HMI-115)

== Prolactin receptor dysfunction ==
PRLR dysfunction has been seen to positively regulate the proliferation of malignant cells in breast cancer. Defects in prolactin receptor signalling can trigger tumour activity, rather than suppress it. Signal control is monitored by a variety of genes, and the PRLR gene has been identified in the tissue of metastatic primary breast cancer cells. The defect in the gene is thought to have built a resistance to chemotherapy, and has lost the ability to regulate the apoptosis of cells with mutated DNA. This signalling defect then fails to promote cellular differentiation and promotes the upstream survival of the cancerous cells. In breast cancer, the survival of the breast epithelial cells resembles the malignant cells, characteristically known to have an increased proliferative rate.

== See also ==
- Prolactin modulator
- Hypothalamic–pituitary–prolactin axis
