= Finasteride/latanoprost/minoxidil =

- Finasteride

Latanoprost (left) and minoxidil (right)

Combination of
- Finasteride: 5α-Reductase inhibitor
- Latanoprost: Prostaglandin F receptor agonist
- Minoxidil: Potassium channel opener

Clinical data
- Other names: TH-07; TH07
- Routes of administration: Topical
- Drug class: Hair loss medication

Finasteride/latanoprost/minoxidil (developmental code name TH-07 or TH07) is a topical combination drug which is under development for the treatment of alopecia (hair loss). It is specifically a combination of finasteride (Propecia) (0.1%), a 5α-reductase inhibitor (5α-RI); latanoprost (Xalatan) (0.03%), a prostaglandin F_{2α} analogue and prostaglandin F receptor agonist; and minoxidil (Rogaine) (5%), a K_{ATP} potassium channel opener. All three of these drugs have individually been shown to stimulate hair growth in the setting of alopecia, and both finasteride and minoxidil are approved and widely used for treatment of alopecia. Finasteride/latanoprost/minoxidil is under development by Triple Hair. As of December 2023, the drug is in phase 2 clinical trials.

== See also ==
- List of investigational hair loss drugs
