= Ivarmacitinib =

Chemical compound

Clinical data
- Other names: SHR0302
- ATC code: None

Identifiers
- IUPAC name: (3aS,6aR)-N-(3-Methoxy-1,2,4-thiadiazol-5-yl)-5-[methyl(7H-pyrrolo[2,3-d]pyrimidin-4-yl)amino]-3,3a,4,5,6,6a-hexahydro-1H-cyclopenta[c]pyrrole-2-carboxamide
- CAS Number: 1445987-21-2
- PubChem CID: 71622431
- ChemSpider: 114935320
- UNII: K6K4B9Z5TV
- KEGG: D12211

Chemical and physical data
- Formula: C_{18}H_{22}N_{8}O_{2}S
- Molar mass: 414.49 g·mol^{−1}
- 3D model (JSmol): Interactive image
- SMILES: CN(C1C[C@@H]2CN(C[C@@H]2C1)C(=O)NC3=NC(=NS3)OC)C4=NC=NC5=C4C=CN5
- InChI: InChI=1S/C18H22N8O2S/c1-25(15-13-3-4-19-14(13)20-9-21-15)12-5-10-7-26(8-11(10)6-12)18(27)23-17-22-16(28-2)24-29-17/h3-4,9-12H,5-8H2,1-2H3,(H,19,20,21)(H,22,23,24,27)/t10-,11+,12?; Key:DNBCBAXDWNDRNO-FOSCPWQOSA-N

Ivarmacitinib (SHR0302) is a small molecule drug and selective janus kinase 1 (JAK1) inhibitor. It is being developed for ulcerative colitis, eczema, alopecia areata, and graft-versus-host disease.
