= Rezpegaldesleukin =

Clinical data
- Other names: LY-3471851

Legal status
- Legal status: Investigational

Identifiers
- CAS Number: 2641686-76-0
- UNII: VGR86P26ER

Rezpegaldesleukin is an experimental drug that modulates interleukin-2 and is in development for psoriasis, atopic dermatitis, and alopecia areata. Between 2017 and 2023, it was developed by a partnership of Eli Lilly and Company and Nektar Therapeutics, but the former left the partnership saying the drug lacked efficacy. Nektar disagreed with the interpretation of results, sued its former partner, and is continuing ahead with development.
