= Rodney Sinclair =

- Other names: Rodney D. Sinclair; Rodney Daniel Sinclair
- Occupations: Dermatologist, scientific researcher
- Known for: Hair loss research, low-dose oral minoxidil, sublingual minoxidil
- Website: www.sinclairdermatology.com.au/team/prof-rod-sinclair/

Rodney Sinclair is an Australian dermatologist and scientific researcher specializing in the study and treatment of alopecia (hair loss) and inflammatory skin diseases. His affiliations include the University of Melbourne, St. Vincent's Hospital, Epworth Hospital, and the Sinclair Dermatology Institute for Research, among others. He is responsible for the Sinclair scale hair loss grading system. In addition, Sinclair was responsible for the emergence of low-dose oral minoxidil (LDOM) for treatment of hair loss starting in 2015 with his publications in this area. He is also the founder and director of Samson Clinical, which is developing sublingual minoxidil (SLM) for hair loss. Sinclair has written 7 textbooks in the area of dermatology and published more than 500 research articles.
