= SULT1A1 =

Protein-coding gene in humans

Identifiers
- Aliases: SULT1A1, HAST1/HAST2, P-PST, PST, ST1A1, ST1A3, STP, STP1, TSPST1, sulfotransferase family 1A member 1, ts-PST, P-PST 1
- External IDs: OMIM: 171150; GeneCards: SULT1A1
Available structures
| PDB | Human UniProt search: PDBe RCSB |
| PDB | List of PDB id codes 1LS6, 1Z28, 2D06, 3QVU, 3QVV, 3U3J, 3U3K, 3U3M, 3U3O, 3U3R, 4GRA |
Enzyme activity
| EC # | BRENDA | ExPASy | KEGG | MetaCyc |
|---|---|---|---|---|
| 2.8.2.1 | ↗ | ↗ | ↗ | ↗ |

Gene location (Human)
| Chr. | Chromosome 16 (human) |
| Band | 16p11.2 | Start | 28,603,944 bp |
| Band | 16p11.2 | End | 28,623,625 bp |
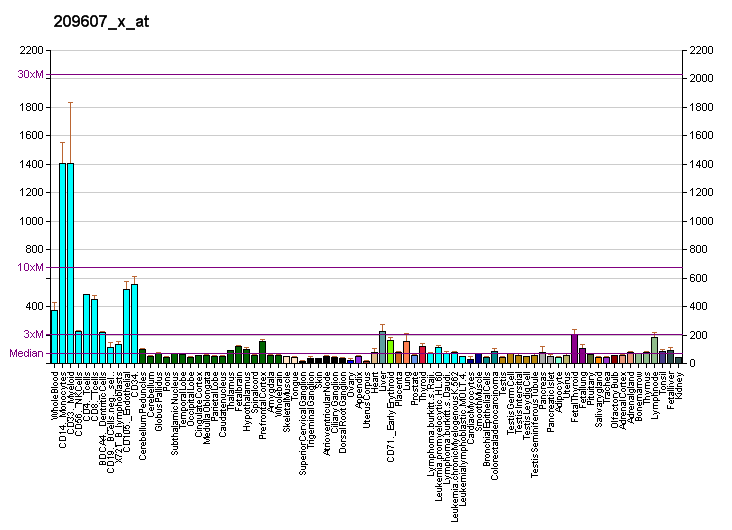

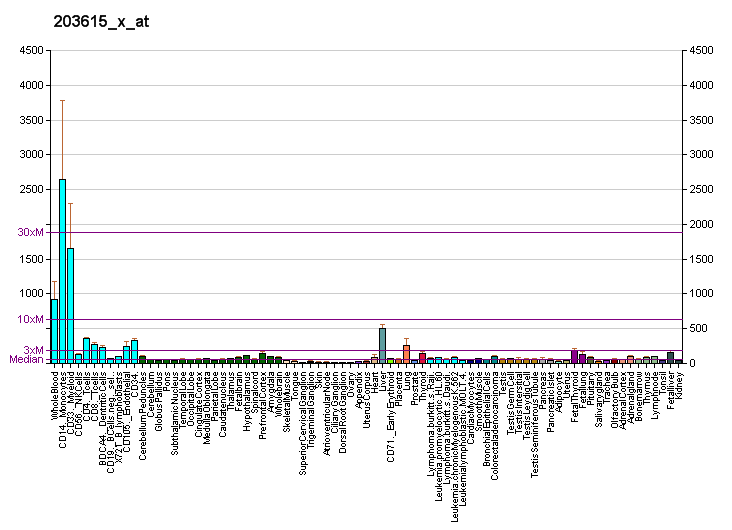

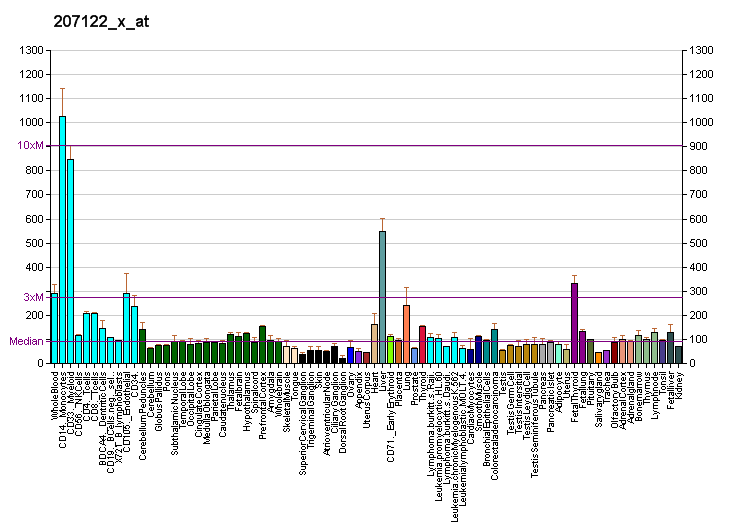
RNA expression pattern
| Bgee | Human / Mouse (ortholog); Top expressed in: mucosa of transverse colon; right adrenal cortex; right lobe of liver; left adrenal gland; monocyte; left adrenal cortex; granulocyte; rectum; right lobe of thyroid gland; right lung / n/a; More reference expression data |
| BioGPS | More reference expression data |
Gene ontology
| Molecular function | transferase activity; sulfotransferase activity; steroid sulfotransferase activity; flavonol 3-sulfotransferase activity; protein binding; aryl sulfotransferase activity |
| Cellular component | cytoplasm; cytosol |
| Biological process | steroid metabolic process; amine metabolic process; catecholamine metabolic process; estrogen metabolic process; sulfation; lipid metabolism; flavonoid metabolic process; xenobiotic metabolic process; ethanol catabolic process; 3'-phosphoadenosine 5'-phosphosulfate metabolic process |
Sources:Amigo / QuickGO
Orthologs
| Databases | NCBI: entry; OMA: entry |
| Species | Human | Mouse |
| Entrez | 6817 | n/a |
| Ensembl | ENSG00000196502 | n/a |
| UniProt | P50225 | n/a |
| RefSeq (mRNA) | NM_177536; NM_001055; NM_177529; NM_177530; NM_177534 NM_001394421; NM_001394422; NM_001394423; NM_001394424; NM_001394425 | n/a |
| RefSeq (protein) | NP_001046; NP_803565; NP_803566; NP_803878; NP_803880 | n/a |
| Location (UCSC) | Chr 16: 28.6 – 28.62 Mb | n/a |
| PubMed search | | n/a |
- Wikidata
| View/Edit Human |

Sulfotransferase 1A1 is an enzyme that in humans is encoded by the SULT1A1 gene.

Sulfotransferase enzymes catalyze the sulfate conjugation of many hormones, neurotransmitters, drugs, and xenobiotic compounds. These cytosolic enzymes are different in their tissue distributions and substrate specificities. The gene structure (number and length of exons) is similar among family members. This gene encodes one of two phenol sulfotransferases with thermostable enzyme activity. Multiple alternatively spliced variants that encode two isoforms have been identified for this gene.

The SULT1A1 enzyme is expressed in outer roots sheath of hair follicles. Minoxidil, the only US FDA approved topical drug for re-growing hair in male and female pattern hair loss (androgenetic alopecia patients) is a pro-drug. Minoxidil is converted to its active form (minoxidil sulfate) by the hair sulfotransferase enzyme (SULT1A1). A large variability in sulfotransferase enzyme expression in hair is observed among people. Low sulfotransferase activity was found to be predictive to lack of response to topical minoxidil for hair re-growth. In a clinical study, a novel formula using a hypoxia mimetic pathway demonstrated to increase SULT1A1 activity in human subjects in-vivo.

== See also ==
- Steroid sulfotransferase
- Steroidogenic enzyme
