= Minoxidil =

Medication to treat high blood pressure and alopecia

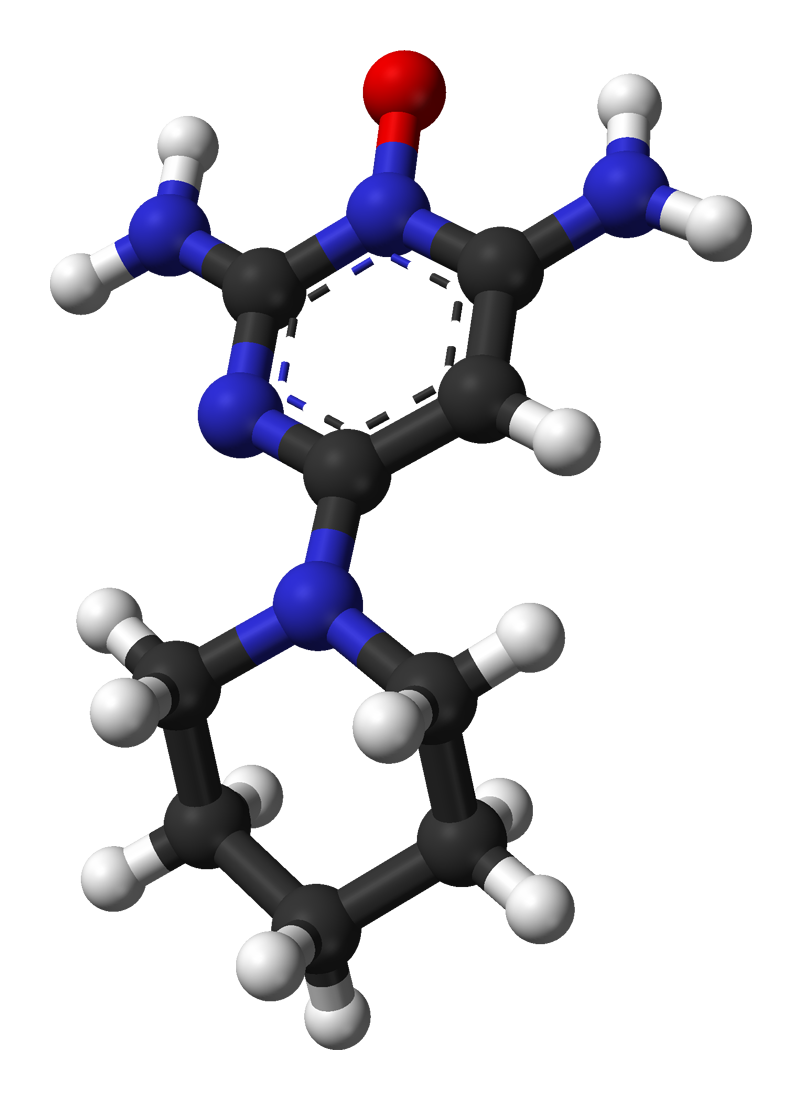

Clinical data
- Trade names: Loniten, Rogaine, others
- Other names: U-10858; U-10,858; U10858; 2,4-Diamino-6-piperidinopyrimidine 3-oxide
- AHFS/Drugs.com: Monograph
- MedlinePlus: a682608
- License data: US DailyMed: Minoxidil
- Pregnancy category: AU: C
- Routes of administration: Oral, sublingual, topical (solution, foam, spray)
- Drug class: Potassium channel opener; K_{ATP} channel opener
- ATC code: C02DC01 (WHO) D11AX01 (WHO)

Legal status
- Legal status: AU: S4 (Prescription only) / S2; UK: General sales list (GSL, OTC) / POM; US: Topical OTC / Oral Rx-only

Pharmacokinetic data
- Bioavailability: Oral: ≥90% (absorption); Topical: ~1.2–1.4%
- Protein binding: Minimal or negligible
- Metabolism: Primarily liver via glucuronidation, hydroxylation, and sulfation (SULT1A1, SULT2A1)
- Metabolites: • Minoxidil glucuronide • Minoxidil sulfate
- Onset of action: Oral: 30–60 minutes (peak); Sublingual: 30 minutes
- Elimination half-life: Oral: 3–4 hours Topical: 22 hours
- Duration of action: Oral: ~72 hours Topical: 10–12 hours
- Excretion: Urine: >97% (10–15% unchanged; within 12–20 hours for oral and 4 days for topical)

Identifiers
- IUPAC name: 2,6-diamino-4-(piperidin-1-yl)pyrimidine 1-oxide
- CAS Number: 38304-91-5
- PubChem CID: 4201
- IUPHAR/BPS: 4254
- DrugBank: DB00350
- ChemSpider: 10438564
- UNII: 5965120SH1
- KEGG: D00418
- ChEBI: CHEBI:6942
- ChEMBL: ChEMBL802
- PDB ligand: MXD (PDBe, RCSB PDB)
- CompTox Dashboard (EPA): DTXSID9040685
- ECHA InfoCard: 100.048.959

Chemical and physical data
- Formula: C_{9}H_{15}N_{5}O
- Molar mass: 209.253 g·mol^{−1}
- 3D model (JSmol): Interactive image
- Melting point: 248 °C (478 °F)
- Solubility in water: < 1
- SMILES: Nc1cc(nc(N)[n+]1[O-])N2CCCCC2
- InChI: InChI=1S/C9H15N5O/c10-7-6-8(12-9(11)14(7)15)13-4-2-1-3-5-13/h6H,1-5,10H2,(H2,11,12); Key:ZFMITUMMTDLWHR-UHFFFAOYSA-N

Minoxidil, sold under the brand names Loniten and Rogaine among others, is a vasodilator medication used for the treatment of high blood pressure and hair loss. It may also be used off-label to promote beard growth and treat nail problems. The drug promotes hair growth, but its effects are fully reversible and it does not prevent hair loss long term. It is available as a generic medication by prescription in oral tablet form and over-the-counter as a topical liquid or foam. Oral minoxidil is used at high doses to treat high blood pressure and at low doses to treat hair loss, while topical minoxidil is used exclusively for hair loss and related indications. Extended-release oral minoxidil and sublingual minoxidil formulations for hair loss are also being studied and developed.

Side effects of oral minoxidil may include low blood pressure, water retention and edema, salt retention, rapid heartbeat, dizziness, lightheadedness, headaches, excessive hair growth, and temporary hair shedding. Adverse effects of topical minoxidil include skin irritation, itching, dandruff, and temporary hair shedding. Rare but serious adverse effects of oral minoxidil include pericardial effusion, pleural effusion, cardiac tamponade, other cardiovascular complications, and pseudoacromegaly. Minoxidil is a prodrug of minoxidil sulfate, which acts as a K_{ATP} potassium channel opener to widen blood vessels and increase hair growth. The effects of minoxidil are dose-dependently similar to the symptoms of Cantú syndrome.

Minoxidil was discovered in 1963 and was introduced for treatment of high blood pressure in 1971. In 1971, researchers unexpectedly discovered that minoxidil causes hair growth, resulting in it being repurposed for treatment of hair loss and approved in topical form for this use in 1988. Topical minoxidil became available over-the-counter in 1996. Low-dose oral minoxidil (LDOM) emerged for treatment of hair loss in 2015 and dramatically increased in popularity starting in 2022. Extended-release oral minoxidil and sublingual minoxidil were developed in the 2020s for hair loss and are in late-stage trials. Aside from its use in humans, minoxidil is extremely toxic to cats and dogs even in small amounts.

== Medical uses ==
=== High blood pressure ===
Minoxidil, when used for hypertension, is generally reserved for use in severe hypertension patients who do not respond to at least two agents and a diuretic. Minoxidil is also generally administered with a loop diuretic to prevent sodium retention and potassium retention. It may also cause a reflex tachycardia and thus is prescribed with a beta blocker.

=== Hair loss ===
Minoxidil is used for the treatment of hair loss. It is mainly used topically, but in more recent years, it also being used at low doses orally and to a lesser extent sublingually. The drug is effective in helping promote hair growth in both men and women with androgenic alopecia (androgen-dependent pattern hair loss). It works by increasing hair counts as well as by thickening individual hair follicles. Minoxidil is less effective when the area of hair loss is large. In addition, its effectiveness has largely been demonstrated in younger men who have experienced hair loss for less than 5 years. Minoxidil use is indicated for central (vertex) hair loss only.

Minoxidil must be used indefinitely for continued support of existing hair follicles and the maintenance of any experienced hair regrowth. Its benefits are tangible but fully reversible, with discontinuation following long-term treatment resulting in rapid hair loss and similar hair density as placebo at 24 weeks post-discontinuation. As such, minoxidil does not appear to prevent hair loss long term.

Low-dose oral minoxidil (LDOM) is used off-label against hair loss and to promote hair regrowth. Oral minoxidil is an effective and well-tolerated treatment alternative for patients having difficulty with topical formulations. It is notable in this regard that topical minoxidil for hair loss has very low compliance rates, with almost all users discontinuing it after 1 year of use. Consensus statements provide guidance on use of low-dose oral minoxidil for hair loss. Dosing of low-dose oral minoxidil for hair loss has additionally been reviewed. Higher doses are more effective for improving hair loss than lower doses, but also come with greater hypertrichosis incidence.

Another option for hair loss treatment is sublingual minoxidil (SLM), which may have improved tolerability with retained efficacy compared to oral minoxidil.

Minoxidil requires at least 2 to 4 months before the first benefits on hair growth can be observed. Maximal effectiveness occurs after 12 months.

=== Beard growth ===
Minoxidil has been studied for enhancement of facial hair or beard growth, including for transgender men.

=== Nail problems ===
Minoxidil has been studied in the treatment of onychodystrophy (nail problems). It has been assessed in at least 6 clinical studies for this purpose, with the employed formulations including 2 to 5% topical minoxidil and 1.25 to 2.5 mg/day oral minoxidil. The drug has been found to increase the rate of nail growth, improve nail appearance, increase nail strength, and resolve yellow nail discoloration.

=== Available forms ===
Minoxidil is available in the form of oral tablets, topical solution, topical foam, and topical spray. The tablets include 2.5, 5 and 10 mg forms; the solutions include 2% and 5% forms, and the foam and spray are both 5% concentration. The topical solutions are formulated with polyethylene glycol (PEG) to enhance absorption of minoxidil. The topical solution is often referred to as minoxidil topical solution (MTS) and the topical foam is known as minoxidil topical foam (MTF).

== Contraindications ==
In the case of oral minoxidil, absolute contraindications include pheochromocytoma, history of pericardial effusion or cardiac tamponade, history of pericarditis, history of pulmonary hypertension associated with mitral stenosis, hypersensitivity, and pregnancy and breastfeeding, whereas relative contraindications or precautions include hypotension (<90/60 mm hg), kidney impairment or failure, dialysis, history of heart attack, and history of tachycardia or other arrhythmia. Congestive heart failure is an absolute or relative contraindication according to different sources.

== Side effects ==
Side effects of oral minoxidil may include salt retention, water retention and edema, rapid heartbeat, dizziness, lightheadedness, headaches, and hypertrichosis (excessive hair growth).

Topically applied minoxidil is generally well-tolerated, but common side effects include itching of the eyes, general itching, irritation at the treated area, and unwanted hair growth elsewhere on the body. Alcohol and propylene glycol present in some topical preparations may dry the scalp, resulting in dandruff and contact dermatitis.

Sublingual minoxidil may have reduced side effects with retained effectiveness compared to oral minoxidil. This is due to less minoxidil sulfate being formed during first-pass metabolism and due to local activation of minoxidil into minoxidil sulfate within hair follicles. In a preliminary clinical trial, no adverse effects or changes in blood pressure occurred with low-dose sublingual minoxidil.

Oral minoxidil has been implicated in causing pericarditis, pericardial effusion, and pleural effusion. Cardiac tamponade secondary to pericardial effusion, which can be life-threatening, is also known to occur. Pericardial effusion has been found to occur in about 3% of people at hypertension doses. This is usually associated with impaired renal function, connective tissue disease, uremic syndrome, congestive heart failure, or marked fluid retention, though cases without these potential risk factors have also been reported. There have been case reports dating back to the 1980s describing these phenomena, including with oral minoxidil and rarely even topical minoxidil. However, these cardiovascular complications are much less common and rare with oral minoxidil at the low doses used to treat hair loss. Potential symptoms indicating these minoxidil-induced cardiovascular complications include dyspnea (shortness of breath) and edema (fluid build-up).

Minoxidil has also been associated with a number of other types of cardiovascular complications, like ischemic heart disease, pulmonary hypertension, left ventricular hypertrophy, and specific electrocardiogram (ECG) abnormalities. Cardiac lesions, such as focal necrosis of the papillary muscle and subendocardial areas of the left ventricle, have been observed in laboratory animals treated with minoxidil as well.

K_{ATP} channel openers like levcromakalim and minoxidil have been strongly implicated in inducing headache and migraine.

Pseudoacromegaly is an extremely rare side effect reported with large doses of oral minoxidil. Oral minoxidil has been reported to cause coarsening of facial features in case reports.

== Overdose ==
Overdose of minoxidil has been reviewed. In 2013 or 2014, a seven-year-old girl was admitted to a children's hospital in Toulouse in France after accidentally ingesting a teaspoon of Alopexy (a brand name for minoxidil in France). The child vomited constantly after ingestion and showed hypotension and tachycardia for 40 hours. The authors of the report on the incident stressed that the product should be kept out of reach of children, and urged manufacturers to consider more secure child-resistant packaging.

== Interactions ==
Combination of oral minoxidil with guanethidine can result in profound orthostatic hypotension.

Low-dose daily aspirin can reduce the effectiveness of topical minoxidil for hair loss. This is thought to be because aspirin inhibits sulfotransferase activity and hence prevents conversion of minoxidil into its active form minoxidil sulfate. Salicylic acid is also a sulfotransferase inhibitor and could likewise affect the effectiveness of topical minoxidil. In addition, paracetamol (acetaminophen) is a sulfate scavenger and may inhibit minoxidil activation into minoxidil sulfate and effectiveness.

== Pharmacology ==
=== Mechanism of action ===
The mechanism by which minoxidil promotes hair growth is not fully understood. Minoxidil is an adenosine 5'-triphosphate (ATP)-sensitive potassium channel opener, causing hyperpolarization of cell membranes. Theoretically, by widening blood vessels and opening potassium channels, it allows more oxygen, blood, and nutrients to the follicles. Moreover, minoxidil contains a nitric oxide moiety and may act as a nitric oxide agonist. This may cause follicles in the telogen phase to shed, which are then replaced by thicker hairs in a new anagen phase. Minoxidil is a prodrug that is converted by sulfation via the sulfotransferase enzyme SULT1A1 to its active form, minoxidil sulfate. The effect of minoxidil is mediated by adenosine, which triggers intracellular signal transduction via both adenosine A_{1} receptors and two sub-types of adenosine A_{2} receptors (A_{2A} and A_{2B} receptors). Minoxidil acts as an activator of the Kir6/SUR2 channel upon selective binding to SUR2. The expression of SUR2B in dermal papilla cells might play a role in the production of adenosine. Minoxidil induces cell growth factors such as VEGF, HGF, IGF-1 and potentiates HGF and IGF-1 actions by the activation of uncoupled sulfonylurea receptor on the plasma membrane of dermal papilla cells.

A number of in vitro effects of minoxidil have been described in monocultures of various skin and hair follicle cell types including stimulation of cell proliferation, inhibition of collagen synthesis, and stimulation of vascular endothelial growth factor, prostaglandin synthesis and leukotriene B4 expression.

Minoxidil causes a redistribution of cellular iron through its apparent capacity to bind this metal ion. By binding iron in a Fenton-reactive form, intracellular hydroxyl radical production would ensue, but hydroxyl would be immediately trapped and scavenged by the minoxidil to generate a nitroxyl radical. It is presumed that this nitroxyl radical will be capable of reduction by glutathione to reform minoxidil. Such a process would cycle until the minoxidil is otherwise metabolized and would result in rapid glutathione depletion with glutathione disulphide formation and therefore with concomitant consumption of NADPH/NADH and other reducing equivalents. Minoxidil inhibited PHD by interfering with the normal function of ascorbate, a cofactor of the enzyme, leading to a stabilization of HIF-1α protein and a subsequent activation of HIF-1. In an in vivo angiogenesis assay, millimolar minoxidil increased blood vessel formation in a VEGF-dependent manner. Minoxidil inhibition of PHD occurs via interrupting ascorbate binding to iron. The structural feature of positioning amines adjacent to nitric oxide may confer the ability of millimolar minoxidil to chelate iron, thereby inhibiting PHD. Minoxidil is capable of tetrahydrobiopterin inhibition as a cofactor for nitric oxide synthase.

Minoxidil stimulates prostaglandin E_{2} production by activating COX-1 and prostaglandin endoperoxide synthase-1 but inhibits prostacyclin production. Additionally, expression of the prostaglandin E_{2} receptor, the most upregulated target gene in the β-catenin pathway of DP cells, was enhanced by minoxidil, which may enable hair follicles to grow continuously and maintain the anagen phase.

Due to the anti-fibrotic activity of minoxidil inhibition of enzyme lysyl hydroxylase present in fibroblast may result in the synthesis of a hydroxylysine-deficient collagen. Minoxidil can also potentially stimulate elastogenesis in aortic smooth muscle cells, and in skin fibroblasts in a dose-dependent manner. In hypertensive rats, minoxidil increases elastin levels in the mesenteric, abdominal, and renal arteries by a decrease in elastase enzyme activity in these tissues. In rats, potassium channel openers decrease calcium influx which inhibits elastin gene transcription through extracellular signal-regulated kinase 1/2 (ERK 1/2)-activator protein 1 signaling pathway. ERK 1/2 increases, through elastin gene transcription, adequately cross-linked elastic fiber content synthesized by smooth muscle cells, and decreases the number of cells in the aorta.

Minoxidil possesses α_{2}-adrenergic receptor agonist activity, stimulates the peripheral sympathetic nervous system (SNS) by way of carotid and aortic baroreceptor reflexes. Minoxidil administration also brings an increase in plasma renin activity, largely due to the aforementioned activation of the SNS. This activation of the renin-angiotensin axis further prompts increased biosynthesis of aldosterone; whereas plasma and urinary aldosterone levels are increased early in the course of treatment with minoxidil, over time these values tend to normalize presumably because of accelerated metabolic clearance of aldosterone in association with hepatic vasodilation.

Minoxidil may be involved in the inhibition of serotonin 5-HT_{2} receptors.

Minoxidil might increase blood–tumor barrier permeability in a time-dependent manner by downregulating tight junction protein expression and this effect could be related to ROS/RhoA/PI3K/PKB signal pathway. Minoxidil significantly increases ROS concentration when compared to untreated cells.

Minoxidil treatment resulted in a "0.22-fold change" for 5α-reductase 2 (p < 0.0001) in vitro. This antiandrogenic effect of minoxidil, shown by significant downregulation of 5α-reductase 2 gene expression in HaCaT cells, may be one of its mechanisms of action in alopecia.

The effects of minoxidil have been found to mimic the symptoms of Cantú syndrome, which involves gain-of-function mutations in K_{ATP} channel subunits (specifically SUR2 and K_{IR}6.1). Examples of these minoxidil effects are hypertrichosis, pericardial effusions, pulmonary hypertension, edema, and coarsening of facial features. Relatedly, there has been concern that excessive doses of minoxidil and other K_{ATP} potassium channel openers might cause a "drug-induced Cantú syndrome".

The circulating levels at which minoxidil produces hair growth are lower than those at which it produces cardiovascular effects.

=== Pharmacokinetics ===
==== Absorption ====
Minoxidil is readily absorbed from the gastrointestinal tract with oral administration. Its absorption from the gut is around 90% or more. The drug reaches peak levels after about 30 to 60 minutes. Following attainment of peak levels, concentrations of minoxidil rapidly decline. Sublingual minoxidil is expected to have higher bioavailability than topical minoxidil. Peak levels with sublingual administration occurred after 30 minutes. The bioavailability of oral minoxidil is not affected by food and it can be taken in either a fasted or fed state.

In the case of topical administration to the scalp, the absorption of minoxidil is only about 1.2 to 1.4%. With this route, serum levels of minoxidil are usually less than 5 ng/mL and are frequently undetectable. It has been predicted that application of 5% topical minoxidil twice to the entire scalp might be equivalent to a single 5.4 mg oral dose of minoxidil in terms of systemic exposure. The stratum corneum of the scalp is saturated by minoxidil and acts as a reservoir for the drug. This results in a continuous flow of minoxidil in the scalp, with absorption being completed after about 10 to 12 hours. Based on these findings, topical minoxidil is generally applied twice daily. A wet scalp has been found to increase the absorption of topical minoxidil.

Peak levels of minoxidil with oral minoxidil were 16.8 ng/mL with 2.5 mg, 37.2 ng/mL with 5 mg, and 74.7 ng/mL with 10 mg doses. Mean peak minoxidil levels with a single 0.45 mg dose of sublingual minoxidil were 1.62 ng/mL (range 0.3–5.3 ng/mL). Circulating levels of 0.6 ng/mL with 2% solution and 1.6 ng/mL with 5% solution occur with topical minoxidil. However, levels vary between individuals, with a range of undetectable to 7.5 ng/mL with 3% solution in 12 individuals in one study. Significant cardiological and hemodynamic effects are said to occur with minoxidil when serum minoxidil levels exceed 20 ng/mL.

==== Distribution ====
The volume of distribution of oral minoxidil is greater than 200 L. Minoxidil does not cross the blood–brain barrier and hence is peripherally selective. It shows minimal or negligible plasma protein binding.

==== Metabolism ====
Minoxidil is a prodrug of minoxidil sulfate, which can be formed both systemically and locally within hair follicles. This active metabolite is 14-fold more potent than minoxidil in stimulating cysteine incorporation in cultured rodent hair follicles ex vivo. Similarly to minoxidil, it also stimulates hair follicle growth. Minoxidil is sulfated into minoxidil sulfate by at least four cytosolic sulfotransferase enzymes found in skin, scalp, smooth muscle, liver, and fibroblasts. The primary sulfotransferase involved in sulfation of minoxidil in hair follicles is SULT1A1, whereas in the liver, it is SULT2A1. Expression of this enzyme has been found to predict the effectiveness of topical minoxidil.

Oral minoxidil is subject to first-pass metabolism, including rapid and extensive metabolism in the liver. A majority of orally administered minoxidil, about 90%, is metabolized in the liver via glucuronidation, hydroxylation, and sulfation, with glucuronidation being the primary metabolic pathway and minoxidil glucuronide being the predominant metabolite of minoxidil. Conversely, topical minoxidil bypasses the first pass through the liver and is not subject to first-pass metabolism. Similarly, sublingual minoxidil also bypasses first-pass metabolism.

==== Elimination ====
Minoxidil is excreted almost exclusively (>97%) in urine. About 10 to 15% is excreted in urine unchanged. The elimination half-life of oral minoxidil is about 3 to 4 hours. Conversely, the half-life of topical minoxidil is 22 hours on average. Oral minoxidil is excreted within 12 to 20 hours in urine. Despite this however, the hypotensive effect of oral minoxidil lasts approximately 72 hours following a single dose. With discontinuation of topical minoxidil, about 95% of systemically absorbed minoxidil is excreted within 4 days. The renal clearance of oral minoxidil is 352 mL/minute.

== Chemistry ==
=== Properties ===
Minoxidil is an odorless, white to off-white, crystalline powder (crystals from methanol-acetonitrile). When heated to decomposition it emits toxic fumes of nitrogen oxides. It decomposes at 259-261 °C. Its solubility (mg/ml) is propylene glycol 75, methanol 44, ethanol 29, 2-propanol 6.7, dimethylsulfoxide 6.5, water 2.2, chloroform 0.5, acetone <0.5, ethyl acetate <0.5, diethyl ether <0.5, benzene <0.5, acetonitrile <0.5. The pK_{a} of minoxidil is 4.61.

=== Synthesis ===
Another synthesis approach of Minoxidil

Minoxidil, 6-amino-1,2-dihydro-1-hydroxy-2-imino-4-piperidinopyrimidine, is synthesized from barbituric acid, the reaction of which with phosphorus oxychloride gives 2,4,6-trichloropyrimidine. Upon reaction with ammonium, this turns into 2,4-diamino-6-chloropyrimidine. Next, the resulting 2,4-diamino-6-chloropyrimidine undergoes a reaction with 2,4-dichlorophenol in the presence of potassium hydroxide, giving 2,4-diamino-6-(2,4-dichlorophenoxy)-pyrimidine. Oxidation of this product with 3-chloroperbenzoic acid gives 2,4-diamino-6-(2,4-dichlorophenoxy)pyrimidine-3-oxide, the 2,4-dichlorophenoxyl group of which is replaced with a piperidine group at high temperature, giving minoxidil.

== History ==
=== Initial development ===
A predecessor compound of minoxidil was developed in the late 1950s by the Upjohn Company (later became part of Pfizer) to treat ulcers. In trials using dogs, the compound did not cure ulcers but proved to be a powerful vasodilator. Upjohn synthesized over 200 variations of the compound, including the one it developed in 1963 and named minoxidil. These studies resulted in the U.S. Food and Drug Administration (FDA) approving minoxidil (with the brand name Loniten) in the form of oral tablets to treat high blood pressure in 1979.

=== Repurposing for hair growth ===
When Upjohn received permission from the U.S. Food and Drug Administration (FDA) to test the new drug as medicine for hypertension they approached Charles A. Chidsey, at the University of Colorado School of Medicine. He conducted two studies, the second study showing unexpected hair growth. Puzzled by this side-effect, Chidsey consulted Guinter Kahn (who while a dermatology resident at the University of Miami had been the first to observe and report hair development on patients using the minoxidil patch) and discussed the possibility of using minoxidil for treating hair loss.

Kahn, along with his colleague Paul J. Grant, had obtained a certain amount of minoxidil and conducted their own research, since they were first to make the side effect observation. Neither Upjohn or Chidsey at the time were aware of the side effect of hair growth. The two doctors had been experimenting with a 1% solution of minoxidil mixed with several alcohol-based liquids. Both parties filed patents to use minoxidil for hair loss prevention, which resulted in a decade-long trial between Kahn and Upjohn, which ended with Kahn's name included in a consolidated patent (U.S. #4,596,812 Charles A Chidsey, III and Guinter Kahn) in 1986 and royalties from the company to both Kahn and Grant.

Meanwhile, the effect of minoxidil on hair loss prevention was so clear that in the 1980s physicians were prescribing Loniten off-label to their balding patients.

In August 1988, the FDA approved minoxidil for treating baldness in men under the brand name "Rogaine" (FDA rejected Upjohn's first choice, Regain, as misleading). The agency concluded that although "the product will not work for everyone", 39% of the men studied had "moderate to dense hair growth on the crown of the head". "Men's Rogaine", marketed by Johnson & Johnson went off-patent on January 20, 2006.

In 1991, Upjohn made the product available for women. "Women's Rogaine", marketed by Johnson & Johnson, went off-patent in February 2014.

=== Non-topical formulations for hair growth ===
Low-dose oral minoxidil started to emerge as a treatment for hair loss in 2015 and after with the work of Rodney Sinclair and other researchers. Subsequently, interest in and use of low-dose oral minoxidil for hair loss increased dramatically following the publication of an August 2022 New York Times article titled "An Old Medicine Grows New Hair for Pennies a Day, Doctors Say". New non-topical formulations of minoxidil for hair loss, such as extended-release oral minoxidil and sublingual minoxidil, have been developed in the 2020s towards formal approval for treatment of hair loss and with improved efficacy and/or tolerability profiles.

== Society and culture ==
=== Economics ===
In February 1996, the FDA approved both the over-the-counter sale and the production of generic formulations of minoxidil. Upjohn replied to that by lowering prices to half the price of the prescription drug and by releasing a prescription 5% formula of Rogaine in 1997. In 1998, a 5% formulation of minoxidil was approved for nonprescription sale by the FDA. The 5% aerosol foam formula was approved for medical use in the US in 2006. The generic versions of the 5% aerosol foam formula were approved in 2017.

In 2017, a study of pharmacy prices in four states for 41 over-the-counter minoxidil products which were "gender-specified" found that the mean price for minoxidil solutions was the same for women and men even though the women's formulations were 2% and the men's were 5%, while the mean price for minoxidil foams, which were all 5%, was 40% higher for women. The authors noted this was the first time gender-based pricing had been shown for a medication.

=== Brand names ===
As of June 2017, Minoxidil is sold under many brand names worldwide, including but not limited to: Alomax, Alopek, Alopexy, Alorexyl, Alostil, Aloxid, Aloxidil, Anagen, Apo-Gain, Axelan, Belohair, Boots Hair Loss Treatment, Botafex, Capillus, Carexidil, Coverit, Da Fei Xin, Dilaine, Dinaxcinco, Dinaxil, Ebersedin, Eminox, Folcare, Follixil, Guayaten, Hair Grow, Hair-Treat, Hairgain, Hairgaine, Hairgrow, Hairway, Headway, Inoxi, Ivix, Keranique, Lacovin, Locemix, Loniten, Lonnoten, Lonolox, Lonoten, Loxon, M E Medic, Maev-Medic, Mandi, Manoxidil, Mantai, Men's Rogaine, Minodil, Minodril, Minostyl, Minovital, Minox, Minoxi, Minoxidil, Minoxidilum, Minoximen, Minoxiten, Minscalp, Mintop, Modil, Morr, Moxidil, Neo-Pruristam, Neocapil, Neoxidil, Nherea, Nioxin, Noxidil, Oxofenil, Pilfud, Pilogro, Pilomin, Piloxidil, Re-Stim, Re-Stim+, Recrea, Regain, Regaine, Regaxidil, Regro, Regroe, Regrou, Regrowth, Relive, Renobell Locion, Reten, Rexidil, Rogaine, Rogan, Scalpmed, Si Bi Shen, Splendora, Superminox, Trefostil, Tricolocion, Tricoplus, Tricovivax, Tricoxane, Trugain, Tugain, Unipexil, Vaxdil, Vius, Women's Regaine, Xenogrow, Xtreme Boost, Xtreme Boost+, Xue Rui, Ylox, and Zeldilon. It is also sold as a combination medication with amifampridine under the brand names Gainehair and Hair 4 U; and as a combination with tretinoin and clobetasol under the brand name Sistema GB.

== Research ==
=== Hair loss ===
An extended-release formulation of low-dose oral minoxidil is under development for treatment of hair loss. It is being developed by Veradermics under the developmental code name VDPHL01. As of September 2025, it is in phase 3 clinical trials for this indication.

A low-dose sublingual formulation of minoxidil is under development for treatment of hair loss. It is being developed by Samson Clinical. As of September 2025, it is in phase 3 clinical trials for this indication. The pharmacokinetics of this formulation are being studied.

Finasteride/latanoprost/minoxidil (developmental code name TH-07 or TH07; Triple Hair) is a topical combination drug including minoxidil, finasteride, and latanoprost which is under development for the treatment of hair loss. As of December 2023, it is in phase 2 clinical trials for this indication.

AB-103 is a minoxidil sulfotransferase stimulant which enhances minoxidil conversion into its active form minoxidil sulfate in hair follicles and is under development as a topical medication for the treatment of hair loss. Sulfotransferase activity in hair follicles has been associated with minoxidil's clinical effectiveness. As of February 2024, AB-103 is in phase 3 clinical trials for this indication, although there have been no new updates since 2019.

=== Other uses ===
Minoxidil is being investigated as a potential treatment for ovarian cancer.

== Toxicity to animals ==
Minoxidil is highly toxic to dogs and cats, even in doses as small as a drop or lick. There are reported cases of cats dying shortly after coming in contact with minimal amounts of the substance. There is no specific antidote, but lipid rescue has been used successfully.
