= Insulin glargine/lixisenatide =

Combination drug

Combination of
- Insulin glargine: Long acting insulin
- Lixisenatide: Glucagon-like peptide-1 receptor agonist

Clinical data
- Trade names: Soliqua, Suliqua, others
- Other names: HOE901/AVE0010
- AHFS/Drugs.com: Professional Drug Facts
- Pregnancy category: AU: B3
- Routes of administration: Subcutaneous
- ATC code: A10AE54 (WHO)

Legal status
- Legal status: CA: ℞-only; US: ℞-only; EU: Rx-only

Identifiers
- CAS Number: 2072879-11-7
- KEGG: D11034

Insulin glargine/lixisenatide, sold under the brand name Soliqua among others, is a fixed-dose combination medication that combines insulin glargine and lixisenatide and is used to treat diabetes.

The most common side effects include hypoglycemia (low blood glucose), diarrhea, vomiting and nausea (feeling sick).

Insulin glargine/lixisenatide was approved for medical use in the United States in November 2016, and in the European Union in January 2017.

== Medical uses ==
Insulin glargine/lixisenatide is approved as a prescription for adults with type 2 diabetes mellitus poorly controlled by lixisenatide or basal insulin alone. According to the American Diabetes Association, combination treatment of a GLP-1 receptor agonist with basal insulin should occur after HbA1C levels remain above target (7% for most type 2 people with diabetes) following use of basal insulin.

The use of insulin glargine/lixisenatide and lixisenatide-containing products is not recommended for use while pregnant. There is insufficient data in humans to form a pregnancy risk category for lixisenatide. Animal pregnancy studies have shown potential risks to the prenate, but it is unclear if these risks are related to the drug. It is unknown if insulin glargine and lixisenatide are present in human milk or the effects these drugs would have on breastfed infants. Potential adverse effects to the mother and child as well as management of diabetes and glucose control should be considered prior to use of Soliqua during breastfeeding.

== Adverse effects ==
Prior to the approval of insulin glargine/lixisenatide, two studies were conducted to evaluate the safety of the formulation. Adverse reactions for at least 5% of people taking it were hypoglycemia, nausea, nasopharyngitis, diarrhea, upper respiratory tract infections, and headache. In Study A (N=469), symptoms of hypoglycemia were recorded in 25.6% of people with zero cases of severe symptomatic hypoglycemia. Study B (N=365) had a 40% incidence of hypoglycemic events with 1.1% incidence of severe hypoglycemia requiring assistance.

== Interactions ==
Lixisenatide and other GLP-1 receptor agonist slow emptying of stomach contents, which may affect the absorption of orally administered medications. For effective use, oral contraceptives should be taken 1 hour before or 11 hours after taking lixisenatide-containing products. Acetaminophen and antibiotics are among other drugs that are affected by this action of lixisenatide.

== History ==
Lixisenatide is a GLP-1 receptor agonist that was created by Zealand Pharma A/S of Denmark; in 2003 Zealand licensed it to Sanofi which developed the drug. Lixisenatide was approved by the European Commission on 1 February 2013. Sanofi submitted an NDA in the US, which was accepted for review by the US FDA in February 2013 but after discussions with the FDA about the cardiovascular safety data included in the package (starting in 2008, the FDA had required stronger CV safety data for new anti-diabetes drugs, following the controversy around the risks of Avandia) Sanofi decided to withdraw the NDA and wait for the results of a Phase III study that was scheduled to be completed in 2015. Sanofi resubmitted the application which the FDA accepted in September 2015, by which time Sanofi had lost the lead in the field of anti-diabetic drugs to Novo Nordisk. Lixisenatide received FDA approval on 28 July 2016.

In 2010, Sanofi extended a license agreement it had with Zealand for lixisenatide to allow Sanofi to combine it with insulin glargine, which was Sanofi's best selling drug at the time, with sales of around €3 billion in 2009. Sanofi planned to start the Phase III trial that year. Sanofi submitted the new drug application in December 2015 for the combination and spent a US$245M priority voucher to gain a faster review, to try to outrace Novo Nordisk’s Xultophy, a similar combination drug of Novo's insulin Tresiba and Novo's GLP-1 agonist Victoza. Sanofi's application was considered by the same Endocrinologic and Metabolic Drugs Advisory FDA Committee that was considering lixisenatide as a single agent. In May 2016 by a vote of 12–2, with several members of the committee expressing reservations about Sanofi's plans to offer two pens with different ratios of insulin glargine and lixisenatide - one for people who had never taken insulin before and one for people who had; there was also concern about how to handle dosing when switching people from a single drug regimen to the combination drug. In August 2016 the FDA told Sanofi that it was delaying a final decision for three months, and asked Sanofi for more data on how people used the delivery devices. In November 2016, the FDA approved Sanofi's Soliqua formulation (insulin glargine 100 units/mL and lixisenatide 33 mcg/mL). Soliqua became available in American pharmacies in January 2017.

== Society and culture ==
=== Economics ===
Following the US approval of Soliqua, Sanofi made a US$25 million milestone payment to Zealand. Zealand may receive additional payments up to US$110 million along with receiving royalties on global sales. Royalties paid to Zealand for Soliqua are based on a fixed low double-digit percentage of net sales.

In January 2017, Sanofi announced that the wholesale acquisition cost (WAC) of a 3 ml pen of Soliqua is US$127. At the average dose used in clinical trials, this amounts to US$19.90 per day.

According to Sanofi's Half-Year Financial Report, the net sales of Soliqua reached €9 million in the first six months of availability in the United States.

=== Brand names ===
Insulin glargine/lixisenatide was called HOE901/AVE0010 during development and, as of October 2017, has been marketed under the brand names iGlarLixi, Lantus/Lyxumia, LixiLan, and Soliqua.
