= ATC code A10 =

Pharmaceutical drug classification

ATC code A10 Drugs used in diabetes is a therapeutic subgroup of the Anatomical Therapeutic Chemical Classification System, a system of alphanumeric codes developed by the World Health Organization (WHO) for the classification of drugs and other medical products. Subgroup A10 is part of the anatomical group A Alimentary tract and metabolism.

Codes for veterinary use (ATCvet codes) can be created by placing the letter Q in front of the human ATC code: for example, QA10.
National versions of the ATC classification may include additional codes not present in this list, which follows the WHO version.

== A10A Insulins and analogues ==
=== A10AB Insulins and analogues for injection, fast-acting ===
A10AB01 Insulin (human)
A10AB02 Insulin (beef)
A10AB03 Insulin (pork)
A10AB04 Insulin lispro
A10AB05 Insulin aspart
A10AB06 Insulin glulisine
A10AB30 Combinations

=== A10AC Insulins and analogues for injection, intermediate-acting ===
A10AC01 Insulin (human)
A10AC02 Insulin (beef)
A10AC03 Insulin (pork)
A10AC04 Insulin lispro
A10AC30 Combinations

=== A10AD Insulins and analogues for injection, intermediate- or long-acting combined with fast-acting ===
A10AD01 Insulin (human)
A10AD02 Insulin (beef)
A10AD03 Insulin (pork)
A10AD04 Insulin lispro
A10AD05 Insulin aspart
A10AD06 Insulin degludec and insulin aspart
A10AD30 Combinations

=== A10AE Insulins and analogues for injection, long-acting ===
A10AE01 Insulin (human)
A10AE02 Insulin (beef)
A10AE03 Insulin (pork)
A10AE04 Insulin glargine
A10AE05 Insulin detemir
A10AE06 Insulin degludec
A10AE07 Insulin icodec
A10AE30 Combinations
A10AE54 Insulin glargine and lixisenatide
A10AE56 Insulin degludec and liraglutide
A10AE57 Insulin icodec and semaglutide

=== A10AF Insulins and analogues for inhalation ===
A10AF01 Insulin (human)

== A10B Blood glucose lowering drugs, excluding insulins ==
=== A10BA Biguanides ===
A10BA01 Phenformin
A10BA02 Metformin
A10BA03 Buformin

=== A10BB Sulfonylureas ===
A10BB01 Glibenclamide
A10BB02 Chlorpropamide
A10BB03 Tolbutamide
A10BB04 Glibornuride
A10BB05 Tolazamide
A10BB06 Carbutamide
A10BB07 Glipizide
A10BB08 Gliquidone
A10BB09 Gliclazide
A10BB10 Metahexamide
A10BB11 Glisoxepide
A10BB12 Glimepiride
A10BB31 Acetohexamide

=== A10BC Sulfonamides (heterocyclic) ===
A10BC01 Glymidine

=== A10BD Combinations of oral blood glucose lowering drugs ===
A10BD01 Phenformin and sulfonylureas
A10BD02 Metformin and sulfonylureas
A10BD03 Metformin and rosiglitazone
A10BD04 Glimepiride and rosiglitazone
A10BD05 Metformin and pioglitazone
A10BD06 Glimepiride and pioglitazone
A10BD07 Metformin and sitagliptin
A10BD08 Metformin and vildagliptin
A10BD09 Pioglitazone and alogliptin
A10BD10 Metformin and saxagliptin
A10BD11 Metformin and linagliptin
A10BD12 Pioglitazone and sitagliptin
A10BD13 Metformin and alogliptin
A10BD14 Metformin and repaglinide
A10BD15 Metformin and dapagliflozin
A10BD16 Metformin and canagliflozin
A10BD17 Metformin and acarbose
A10BD18 Metformin and gemigliptin
A10BD19 Linagliptin and empagliflozin
A10BD20 Metformin and empagliflozin
A10BD21 Saxagliptin and dapagliflozin
A10BD22 Metformin and evogliptin
A10BD23 Metformin and ertugliflozin
A10BD24 Sitagliptin and ertugliflozin
A10BD25 Metformin, saxagliptin and dapagliflozin
A10BD26 Metformin and lobeglitazone
A10BD27 Metformin, linagliptin and empagliflozin
A10BD28 Metformin and teneligliptin
A10BD29 Sitagliptin and dapagliflozin
A10BD30 Gemigliptin and dapagliflozin
A10BD31 Metformin, sitagliptin and dapagliflozin
A10BD32 Glimepiride and dapagliflozin
A10BD33 Pioglitazone and dapagliflozin
A10BD34 Metformin and enavogliflozin

=== A10BF Alpha glucosidase inhibitors ===
A10BF01 Acarbose
A10BF02 Miglitol
A10BF03 Voglibose

=== A10BG Thiazolidinediones ===
A10BG01 Troglitazone
A10BG02 Rosiglitazone
A10BG03 Pioglitazone
A10BG04 Lobeglitazone

=== A10BH Dipeptidyl peptidase 4 (DPP-4) inhibitors ===
A10BH01 Sitagliptin
A10BH02 Vildagliptin
A10BH03 Saxagliptin
A10BH04 Alogliptin
A10BH05 Linagliptin
A10BH06 Gemigliptin
A10BH07 Evogliptin
A10BH08 Teneligliptin
A10BH51 Sitagliptin and simvastatin
A10BH52 Gemigliptin and rosuvastatin

=== A10BJ Glucagon-like peptide-1 (GLP-1) analogues ===
A10BJ01 Exenatide
A10BJ02 Liraglutide
A10BJ03 Lixisenatide
A10BJ04 Albiglutide
A10BJ05 Dulaglutide
A10BJ06 Semaglutide
A10BJ07 Beinaglutide

=== A10BK Sodium-glucose co-transporter 2 (SGLT2) inhibitors ===
A10BK01 Dapagliflozin
A10BK02 Canagliflozin
A10BK03 Empagliflozin
A10BK04 Ertugliflozin
A10BK05 Ipragliflozin
A10BK06 Sotagliflozin
A10BK07 Luseogliflozin
A10BK08 Bexagliflozin
A10BK09 Enavogliflozin
QA10BK90 Velagliflozin

=== A10BX Other blood glucose lowering drugs, excluding insulins ===
A10BX01 Guar gum
A10BX02 Repaglinide
A10BX03 Nateglinide
A10BX05 Pramlintide
A10BX06 Benfluorex
A10BX08 Mitiglinide
A10BX15 Imeglimin
A10BX16 Tirzepatide
A10BX17 Carfloglitazar
A10BX18 Dorzagliatin

== A10X Other drugs used in diabetes ==
=== A10XA Aldose reductase inhibitors ===
A10XA01 Tolrestat

=== AA10XX Other drugs used in diabetes ===
A10XX01 Teplizumab
A10XX02 Donislecel
