= Dulaglutide =

Diabetes medication

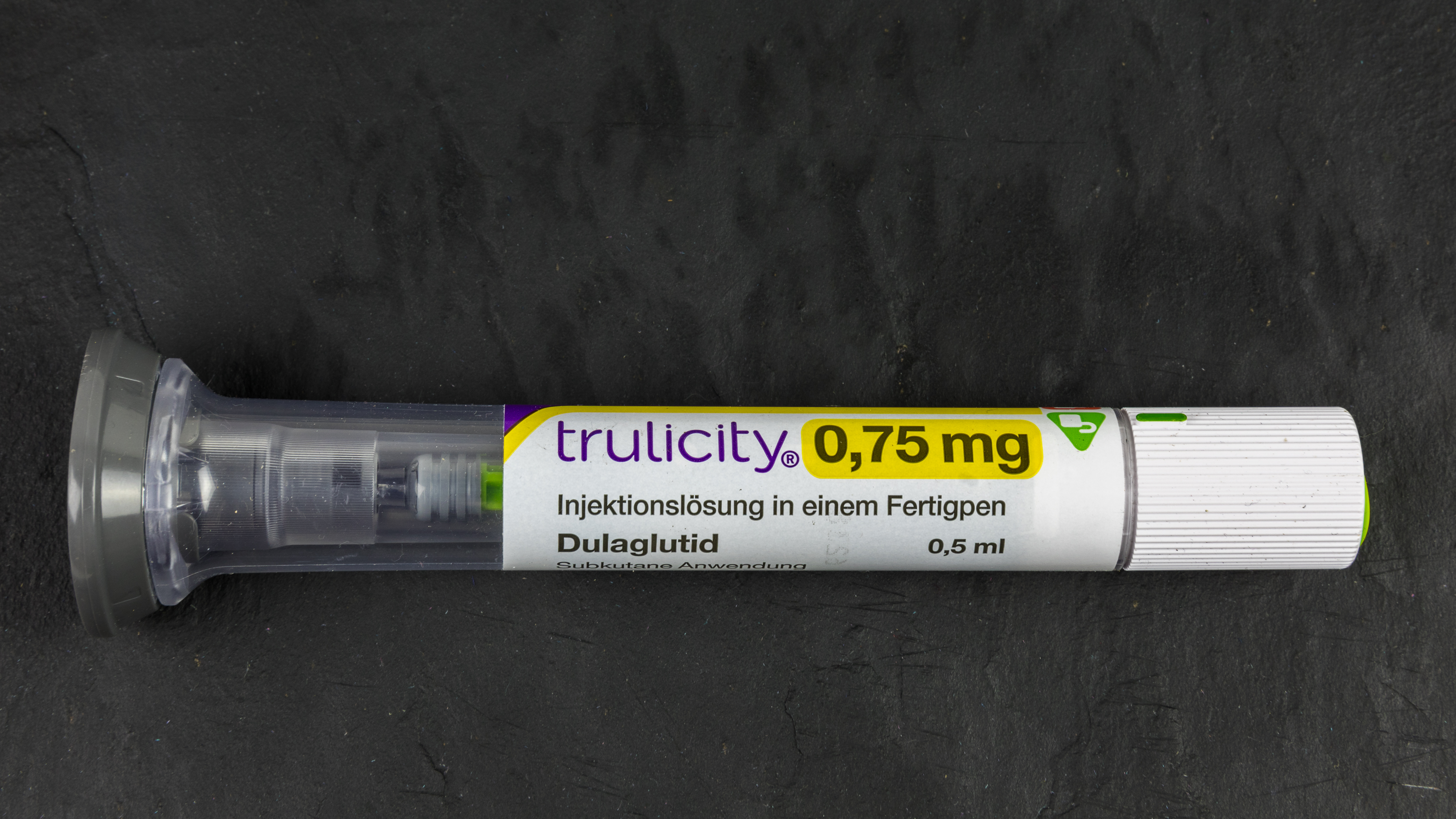

Clinical data
- Trade names: Trulicity, others
- AHFS/Drugs.com: Monograph
- MedlinePlus: a614047
- License data: US DailyMed: Dulaglutide
- Pregnancy category: AU: B3
- Routes of administration: Subcutaneous
- Drug class: Incretin mimetics
- ATC code: A10BJ05 (WHO)

Legal status
- Legal status: AU: S4 (Prescription only); CA: ℞-only; US: ℞-only; EU: Rx-only

Identifiers
- CAS Number: 923950-08-7
- IUPHAR/BPS: 7638
- DrugBank: DB09045
- UNII: WTT295HSY5
- KEGG: D09889
- ChEMBL: ChEMBL2108027

Chemical and physical data
- Formula: C_{2646}H_{4044}N_{704}O_{836}S_{18}
- Molar mass: 59670.63 g·mol^{−1}

Dulaglutide, sold under the brand name Trulicity, is a medication used for the treatment of type 2 diabetes in combination with diet and exercise. This medication is often prescribed for adults and children age 10 and older with type 2 diabetes (citation). It is utilized alongside diet and exercise in order to improve blood sugar. It is also approved in the United States for the reduction of major adverse cardiovascular events such as death, heart attack, or stroke in adults with type 2 diabetes who have established cardiovascular disease or multiple cardiovascular risk factors. It is not yet known if it is beneficial, safe, or effective in lowering blood sugar in children under 10 years of age.

Trulicity is taken by giving an injection once a week under the skin of your stomach, thigh, or upper arm. The medication is a prescription that comes in the form of a pre-filled single-dose pen in 0.75mg, 1.5mg, 3mg, or 4.5mg per 5mg injection. Patients are able to take the dosage at any time during the day of administration with/without food eaten. The most common side effects upon administration are nausea, diarrhea, vomiting, abdominal pain, and decreased appetite.

Dulaglutide injection is in a class of medications called incretin mimetics, as it is a glucagon-like peptide-1 receptor agonist (GLP-1 agonist) consisting of GLP-1(7-37) covalently linked to an Fc fragment of human IgG4. GLP-1 is a hormone that is involved in normalizing the level of glucose in blood (glycemia). It works by aiding the pancreas to release the correct amount of insulin when blood sugar levels are high. Insulin helps to move sugar from the blood onto other body tissues where it's used for energy. Dulaglutide medication also slows the emptying of the stomach and may decrease appetite and cause weight loss.

The Food and Drug Administration (FDA) approved dulaglutide for use in the United States in September 2014. It was approved for use in the European Union in November 2014. In 2023, it was the 63rd most commonly prescribed medication in the United States, with more than 10 million prescriptions.

== Medical uses ==
The compound is indicated for adults with type 2 diabetes as an adjunct to diet and exercise to improve glycemic control. Dulaglutide is not indicated in the treatment of subjects with type 1 diabetes or patients with diabetic ketoacidosis because these problems are the result of the islet cells being unable to produce insulin and one of the actions of dulaglutide is to stimulate functioning islet cells to produce more insulin. Dulaglutide can be used either stand-alone or in combination with other medicines for type 2 diabetes, in particular metformin, sulfonylureas, thiazolidinediones, and insulin taken concomitantly with meals.

The medication's phase 3 clinical trial program demonstrated reductions in hemoglobin A1c of approximately 1% with the 0.75 mg and 1.5 mg doses of the medication, along with approximately 5 pounds of weight loss on average. The higher 3.0 mg and 4.5 mg doses that were approved in 2020 demonstrated hemoglobin A1c reductions closer to 1.5% and slightly more weight loss.

An alternate study conducted by REWIND had enrolled a lower-risk population consisting of 9901 patients, two-thirds had no prior cardiovascular events. These patients were randomized to dulaglutide 1.5mg weekly versus a placebo group for a median of 5.4 years. As a result of this study, Dulaglutide had reduced MACE by 12% (HR 0.88, 95% Cl 0.79-0.99) and had produced a 15% relative risk reduction in the composite renal outcome. (source)

A 2017 meta-analysis did not support the suggestion that treatment with GLP-1 agonists or DPP-4 inhibitors increased all-cause mortality in type 2 diabetics.

== Side effects ==
The most common side effects include gastrointestinal disorders, such as dyspepsia, decreased appetite, nausea, vomiting, abdominal pain, diarrhea. Over the course of a 52-week double-blind study to detect the efficacy and safety of dulaglutide monotherapy versus metformin in type 2 diabetes, the most common side effects seen were nausea, diarrhea, and vomiting [20]. Some patients may experience serious adverse reactions: acute pancreatitis (symptoms include persistent severe abdominal pain, sometimes radiating to the back and accompanied by vomiting), hypoglycemia, renal impairment (which may sometimes require hemodialysis). The risk of hypoglycemia is increased if the drug is used in combination with sulfonylureas or insulin.

Some more serious side effects include:

- Ongoing pain that begins in the upper left or middle of the stomach but may spread to the back
- Vomiting
- Hives, rash, itching
- Difficulty breathing or swallowing
- Swelling of lips, tongue, face, or throat
- Vision changes
- Fast heartbeat
- Dizziness or fainting
- Pain in the upper stomach, fever, yellowing of skin or eyes, or clay-colored stools

Other reported adverse effects of dulaglutide include a small mean increase in heart rate, small decrease in systolic blood pressure and increases in pancreatic enzymes. There is also a potential risk of medullary thyroid carcinoma associated with the use of the drug.

== Contraindications ==
Dulaglutide should not be taken for patients with a personal family history of medullary thyroid carcinoma or in patients with multiple endocrine neoplasia syndrome type 2. Dulaglutide should also not be taken if there is a history of serious hypersensitivity to dulaglutide or any components within it.

Dulaglutide injections may increase any risk of developing thyroid tumors including medullary thyroid carcinoma. Dulaglutide injection has caused thyroid tumors in rats, and it is unknown if this medication increases the risk of tumors in humans. If considering taking Dulaglutide, tell your doctor if anyone in your family has had Multiple Endocrine Neoplasia syndrome type 2 or thyroid cancer. If you experience any of the following symptoms, call your doctor immediately: a lump or swelling in the neck; hoarseness; difficulty swallowing; or shortness of breath

The compound is also contraindicated in subjects with hypersensitivity to the active ingredient or any of the product's components.

== Mechanism of action ==
Dulaglutide binds to glucagon-like peptide 1 receptors, slowing gastric emptying and increasing insulin secretion by pancreatic Beta cells. Simultaneously the compound reduces the elevated glucagon secretion by inhibiting alpha cells of the pancreas, as glucagon is known to be inappropriately elevated in diabetic patients. GLP-1 is normally secreted by L cells of the gastrointestinal mucosa in response to a meal.

== History ==
The safety and effectiveness of dulaglutide were evaluated in six clinical trials in which 3,342 subjects with type 2 diabetes received dulaglutide. Subjects receiving dulaglutide had an improvement in their blood sugar control as observed with reductions in HbA1c level (hemoglobin A1c is a measure of blood sugar control).

The US Food and Drug Administration (FDA) approved dulaglutide with a Risk Evaluation and Mitigation Strategy (REMS), and granted the approval of Trulicity to Eli Lilly and Company. The REMS consists of a number of steps that Eli Lilly will take to make physicians aware of the risk of pancreatitis and the potential risk of medullary thyroid carcinoma associated with the drug.

In 2020, the FDA approved two higher doses of the medication, 3.0 mg and 4.5 mg, based on results of the AWARD-11 trial demonstrating improved glucose lowering and weight benefits.

== Warnings/Precautions ==
- Pancreatitis has been reported in clinical trials, do not continue usage if any pancreatitis has been spotted or confirmed, other therapies should be considered in patients with a prior history of pancreatitis
- Hypoglycemia has been noted when used in combination with an insulin secretagogue or insulin, consider lowering the usage of insulin in order to reduce the risk of hypoglycemia
- Hypersensitivity reactions such as anaphylactic reactions and angioedema have occurred; in this case discontinue Trulicity/dulaglutide and seek medical advice
- Acute kidney injury, monitor the renal function in patients with renal impairment and report severe gastrointestinal reactions
- Severe gastrointestinal disease, as usage may sometimes be associated with severe gastrointestinal reactions.

(Source)

== See also ==
- Semaglutide
