= Dapagliflozin/sitagliptin =

Medication

Combination of
- Dapagliflozin: SGLT-2 inhibitor
- Sitagliptin: DPP-4 inhibitor

Clinical data
- Trade names: Sidapvia
- Pregnancy category: AU: D
- Routes of administration: By mouth
- ATC code: A10BD29 (WHO)

Legal status
- Legal status: AU: S4 (Prescription only); KR: Rx-only

Dapagliflozin/sitagliptin, sold under the brand name Sidapvia, is a fixed-dose combination anti-diabetic medication used for the treatment of type 2 diabetes. It contains dapagliflozin, as propanediol monohydrate, a SGLT-2 inhibitor; and sitagliptin, as phosphate monohydrate, a DPP-4 inhibitor. It is taken by mouth.
