= C14H21N3O3S =

The molecular formula C_{14}H_{21}N_{3}O_{3}S (molar mass: 311.400 g/mol, exact mass: 311.1304 u) may refer to:

- Metahexamide
- Tolazamide
