= Insulin icodec/semaglutide =

Combination drug

Combination of
- Insulin icodec: Insulin analog
- Semaglutide: GLP-1 receptor agonist

Clinical data
- Trade names: Kyinsu
- ATC code: A10AE57 (WHO)

Legal status
- Legal status: EU: Rx-only

Identifiers
- KEGG: D13245

Insulin icodec/semaglutide is an experimental fixed-dose combination of insulin icodec and semaglutide in development for type 2 diabetes by Novo Nordisk. The combination contains insulin icodec, a basal insulin analog; and semaglutide, a glucagon-like peptide 1 (GLP-1) receptor agonist. Insulin icodec regulates glucose metabolism by binding to insulin receptors. Semaglutide regulates insulin and glucagon secretion in a glucose-dependent manner by selectively binding to and activating the GLP-1 receptor, the target for native GLP-1.

== Society and culture ==
=== Legal status ===
In September 2025, the Committee for Medicinal Products for Human Use of the European Medicines Agency adopted a positive opinion, recommending the granting of a marketing authorization for the medicinal product Kyinsu, intended for treatment of type 2 diabetes mellitus. The applicant for this medicinal product is Novo Nordisk A/S. Insulin icodec/semaglutide was authorized for medical use in the European Union in November 2025.
