= Pioglitazone/glimepiride =

Combination drug

Combination of
- Pioglitazone: Thiazolidinedione
- Glimepiride: Sulfonylurea

Clinical data
- Trade names: Duetact, Tandemact
- AHFS/Drugs.com: UK Drug Information
- License data: US DailyMed: Pioglitazone_and_glimepiride
- Routes of administration: By mouth
- ATC code: A10BD06 (WHO)

Legal status
- Legal status: US: ℞-only; EU: Rx-only

Identifiers
- CAS Number: 2509313-62-4
- KEGG: D09848

Pioglitazone/glimepiride, sold under the brand name Duetact among others, is a fixed-dose combination anti-diabetic medication for the treatment of type 2 diabetes. It contains the thiazolidinedione pioglitazone and the sulfonylurea glimepiride. It is taken by mouth.

The most common side effects include upper respiratory tract infections (such as colds), hypoesthesia (reduced sense of touch), bone fractures, weight gain, dizziness, flatulence (gas) and edema (swelling).

Pioglitazone makes cells (fat, muscle and liver) more sensitive to insulin, which means that the body makes better use of the insulin it produces. Glimepiride is a sulphonylurea: it stimulates the pancreas to produce more insulin. Pioglitazone/glimepiride was approved for medical use in the United States in July 2006, and in the European Union in January 2007.

== Medical uses ==
In the United States pioglitazone/glimepiride is indicated as an adjunct to diet and exercise to improve glycemic control in adults with type 2 diabetes mellitus who are already treated with a thiazolidinedione and sulfonylurea or who have inadequate glycemic control on a thiazolidinedione alone or a sulfonylurea alone.

In the European Union pioglitazone/glimepiride is indicated for the treatment of people with type 2 diabetes mellitus who show intolerance to metformin or for whom metformin is contraindicated and who are already treated with a combination of pioglitazone and glimepiride.
