= Zealand Pharma =

Danish biotechnology research company

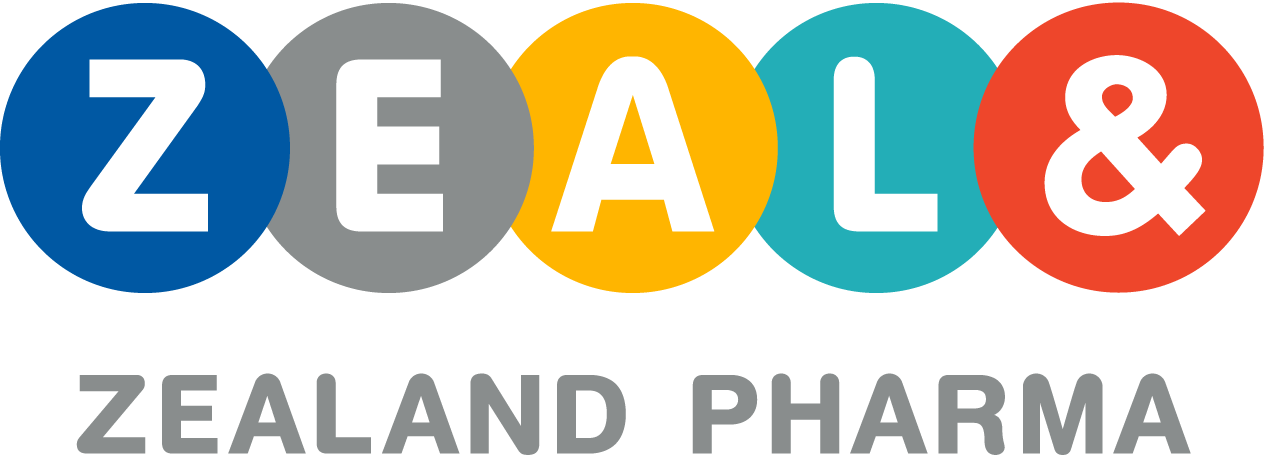
- Traded as: Nasdaq Nordic: ZEAL; OMXC25CAP component
- Founded: 1998
- Headquarters: Sydmarken 11, 2860 Søborg, Denmark
- Key people: Dr. Adam Steensberg (CEO); Martin Nicklasson (Chairman)
- Products: Lyxumia; Danegaoptide
- Total assets: 694,626,000 Danish krone (2016)
- Total equity: 1,4 billion Danish kroner (2019)
- Number of employees: 500+
- Website: https://www.zealandpharma.com/

Zealand Pharma A/S is a Danish biotechnology research company, which designs and develops peptide-based medicines, mainly focusing on metabolic diseases like diabetes and obesity. The company's head office is situated in Søborg near Copenhagen, and it has close to 200 employees. In 2018, they opened a subsidiary in the US. Zealand Pharma forms part of the Danish-Swedish life science cluster Medicon Valley.

== History ==
Zealand Pharma A/S was founded by Bjarne Due Larsen, Lars Hellerung Christiansen, Leif Helth Jensen, Dan Buxbom, and Florian Schönharting in 1997 as Peptide Probe Technologies ApS, a biopharmaceutical company focused on the design and development of peptide-based medicine.

In 1998, the company changed its name to Zealand Pharma ApS following the addition of several new members, including Eva Steiness and former Lundbeck personnel. Eva Steiness was appointed CEO when the company was restructured into a stock corporation, Zealand Pharma A/S, in the spring of 1999.

In 2005, Zealand Pharma tried to be listed on the stock exchange, but had to resign for want of interest from investors. In 2010, they finally succeeded in being listed, and the stocks are now traded at the Copenhagen Stock Exchange (NASDAQ OMX København).

On January 15, 2015, Britt Meelby Jensen acquired the position as CEO from David Solomon, who had led the company during the years 2008–2014. In February 2019, Jensen left her position, and in April 2019, Emmanuel Dulac was chosen and inaugurated as CEO. Dulac has worked both European and American companies within the pharmaceutical industry.

In September 2019, the Dutch family foundation Van Herk Investments injected 560 million Danish Kroner (approx. 64 million pound sterling) into Zealand Pharma, which means the foundation owns a fifth of the company's shares. In October 2019, Zealand Pharma bought up the Canadian biotechnology company Encycle Therapeutics.

On March 30, 2022, Dr. Adam Steensberg assumed the position of Chief Executive Officer.

== Product development ==
Zealand Pharma does not promote and sell products in the market themselves, however, they form partnerships with several international pharmaceutical companies, who are responsible for placing the products on the market.

Zealand Pharma is mostly known and recognized for the diabetes medication Lyxumia, which has been developed in collaboration with the French pharmaceutical company Sanofi. Since 2014, Zealand Pharma has collaborated with the coronary care unit at Rigshospitalet in Copenhagen developing the medication Danegaptid, which should serve the purpose of preventing injuries in the tissue of the heart, frequently seen among angioplasty patients. Furthermore, they are developing several orphan drugs with government assistance.

Because of the acquisition of the Canadian Encycle Therapeutics, Zealand Pharma now also possesses the right to develop and sell the pre-clinical candidate medication ET3764, which is also being developed for the treatment of diseases of the alimentary tract.

Medication	Disease	Phase	Partner
LYXUMIA (LIXISENATIDE) – ex-US	Diabetes Type II	Registration	Sanofi
LYXUMIA (LIXISENATIDE) - US	Diabetes Type II	Phase III	Sanofi
LYXUMIA / LANTUS combination (LixiLan)	Diabetes Type II	Phase III	Sanofi
DANEGAPTIDE	Myocardial ischemic reperfusion injury	Phase II	ZEAL&
ZP2929	Diabetes/Obesity	Phase I	ZEAL&
ELSIGLUTIDE	Chemotherapy Induced diarrhea	Phase II	HELSINN
ZP1480(ABT-719)	Acute kidney damage	Phase II	Abbvie
PETRILINTIDE	Diabetes Type II and Obesity	Phase IIb	Roche

Product pipeline — Zealand pharma
