= Imeglimin =

Chemical compound

Clinical data
- Trade names: Twymeeg
- ATC code: A10BX15 (WHO)

Legal status
- Legal status: Rx-only in Japan

Identifiers
- IUPAC name: (2S)-N^{6},N^{6},2-Trimethyl-1,2-dihydro-1,3,5-triazine-4,6-diamine
- CAS Number: 775351-65-0
- PubChem CID: 24812808
- ChemSpider: 26232690
- UNII: UU226QGU97
- CompTox Dashboard (EPA): DTXSID50228237

Chemical and physical data
- Formula: C_{6}H_{13}N_{5}
- Molar mass: 155.205 g·mol^{−1}
- 3D model (JSmol): Interactive image
- SMILES: C[C@H]1NC(=NC(=N1)N)N(C)C
- InChI: InChI=1S/C6H13N5/c1-4-8-5(7)10-6(9-4)11(2)3/h4H,1-3H3,(H3,7,8,9,10)/t4-/m1/s1; Key:GFICWFZTBXUVIG-SCSAIBSYSA-N

Imeglimin (EMD- 387008,PXL- 008,RVT-1501, brand name Twymeeg) is an oral anti-diabetic medication. It was approved for use in Japan in June 2021.

It is an oxidative phosphorylation blocker that acts to inhibit hepatic gluconeogenesis, increase muscle glucose uptake, and restore normal insulin secretion. It is the first approved drug of this class of anti-diabetic medication.
