= Dapagliflozin/saxagliptin =

Combination drug

Combination of
- Dapagliflozin: SGLT-2 inhibitor
- Saxagliptin: Dipeptidyl peptidase-4 inhibitor

Clinical data
- Trade names: Qtern
- AHFS/Drugs.com: Professional Drug Facts
- License data: US DailyMed: Qtern
- Pregnancy category: AU: D
- Routes of administration: By mouth
- ATC code: A10BD21 (WHO)

Legal status
- Legal status: US: ℞-only; EU: Rx-only

Identifiers
- CAS Number: 2446322-16-1
- KEGG: D10826

Dapagliflozin/saxagliptin, sold under the brand name Qtern, is a fixed-dose combination anti-diabetic medication used as an adjunct to diet and exercise to improve glycemic control in adults with type 2 diabetes. It is a combination of dapagliflozin and saxagliptin. It is taken by mouth.

The most common side effects include upper respiratory tract infection (such as nose and throat infections) and, when used with a sulphonylurea, hypoglycaemia (low blood glucose levels).

Dapagliflozin/saxagliptin was approved for medical use in the European Union in July 2016, and in the United States in February 2017.

== Medical uses ==
In the United States, dapagliflozin/saxagliptin is indicated as an adjunct to diet and exercise to improve glycemic control in adults with type 2 diabetes.

In the European Union, it is indicated in adults aged 18 years and older with type 2 diabetes:

- to improve glycemic control when metformin with or without sulphonylurea (SU) and either saxagliptin or dapagliflozin does not provide adequate glycemic control.
- when already being treated with saxagliptin and dapagliflozin.
