= Glymidine sodium =

Drug

Glycodiazine
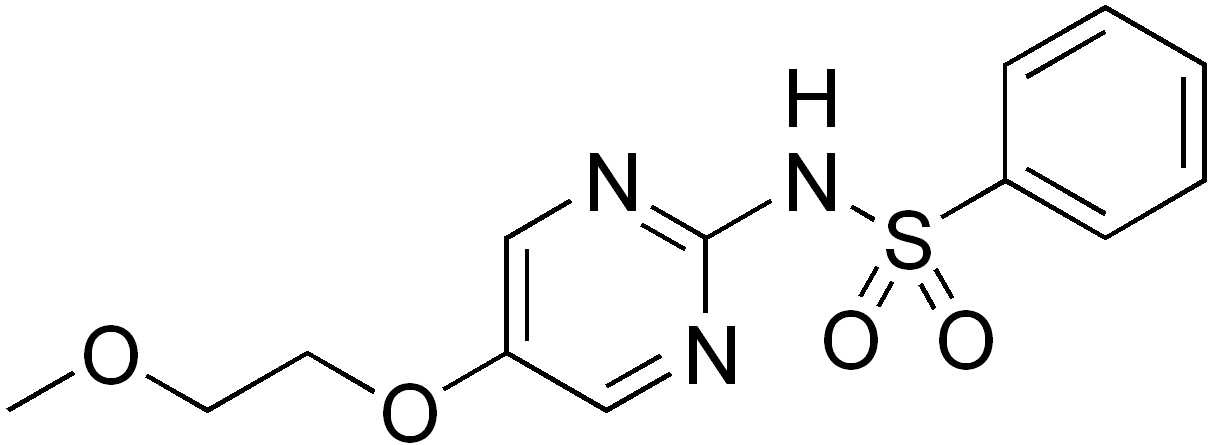

Clinical data
- Routes of administration: Oral
- ATC code: A10BC01 (WHO)

Pharmacokinetic data
- Bioavailability: High
- Protein binding: 90%
- Elimination half-life: 3.8 hours

Identifiers
- IUPAC name: N-[5-(2-methoxyethoxy)pyrimidin-2-yl]benzenesulfonamide
- CAS Number: 339-44-6
- PubChem CID: 9565
- DrugBank: DB01382
- ChemSpider: 9190
- UNII: 4C5I4BQZ8F
- ChEBI: CHEBI:31660
- ChEMBL: ChEMBL1697838
- CompTox Dashboard (EPA): DTXSID1023108
- ECHA InfoCard: 100.005.842

Chemical and physical data
- Formula: C_{13}H_{15}N_{3}O_{4}S
- Molar mass: 309.34 g·mol^{−1}
- 3D model (JSmol): Interactive image
- SMILES: O=S(=O)(Nc1ncc(OCCOC)cn1)c2ccccc2
- InChI: InChI=1S/C13H15N3O4S/c1-19-7-8-20-11-9-14-13(15-10-11)16-21(17,18)12-5-3-2-4-6-12/h2-6,9-10H,7-8H2,1H3,(H,14,15,16); Key:QFWPJPIVLCBXFJ-UHFFFAOYSA-N

Glymidine sodium (INN, also known as glycodiazine; trade name Gondafon) is a sulfonamide antidiabetic drug. It is an oral antidiabetic medication that was used for the management of type 2 diabetes mellitus. It belongs to the sulfonylureas class of drugs, although it is structurally a sulfonamide, and acts primarily by stimulating the pancreas to release more insulin. First reported in 1964, it was introduced into clinical practice in Europe in the mid to late 1960s. While historically significant, glymidine sodium is now primarily available for research purposes and is no longer in widespread clinical use, having been largely superseded by newer diabetes medications.

== Medical uses ==
Glymidine sodium was indicated for the treatment of non-insulin-dependent diabetes mellitus (type 2 diabetes). It was used as an adjunct to diet and exercise to lower blood glucose levels. The typical dosage was 0.5 grams taken twice daily, with a total daily dose ranging from 0.5 to 1.5 grams, administered orally.

== Adverse effects ==
The most significant and potentially life-threatening adverse effect of glymidine sodium is hypoglycemia (low blood sugar). Other reported adverse effects include weakness, dizziness, and fatigue, as well as skin rashes and itching (pruritus). Epigastric discomfort and other gastrointestinal disturbances have also been described, along with dry mouth, joint pain (arthralgia), and backache.

== Contraindications ==
The use of glymidine sodium is contraindicated in individuals with insulin-dependent diabetes mellitus (type 1 diabetes), diabetic ketoacidosis, severe renal or hepatic failure, or known hypersensitivity to sulfonamides. Its use is also not recommended in children, pregnant women, or infants.

== Pharmacology ==
=== Pharmacokinetics ===
Glymidine sodium is rapidly and almost completely absorbed from the gastrointestinal tract following oral administration. It has a high bioavailability and is about 90% bound to plasma proteins. The elimination half-life of the drug is approximately 3.8 to 4 hours.

=== Mechanism of action ===
Similar to other sulfonylureas, glymidine sodium lowers blood glucose by stimulating the release of insulin from the beta cells of the pancreas. This is achieved by binding to and blocking the ATP-sensitive potassium channels on the surface of pancreatic beta cells. The closure of these channels leads to depolarization of the cell membrane, which in turn opens voltage-gated calcium channels. The resulting influx of calcium into the cells triggers the secretion of insulin. Additionally, glymidine sodium has been reported to inhibit hepatic lipolysis, which is the breakdown of fats in the liver.

== Chemistry ==
Glymidine sodium is the sodium salt of glymidine. Its IUPAC name is N-[5-(2-methoxyethoxy)pyrimidin-2-yl]benzenesulfonamide. The chemical formula for the sodium salt is C_{13}H_{14}N_{3}NaO_{4}S.

The synthesis of glymidine was first reported by Gutsche and Kohlmann in 1964. The synthesis is also described in U.S. Patent 3,275,635.

== History ==
Glymidine sodium was first reported in 1964 and was introduced for clinical use in Europe in the mid to late 1960s. It was developed and originally marketed by Bayer and Schering. As an early oral antidiabetic medication, it offered an alternative to insulin for patients with type 2 diabetes.

== Society and culture ==
Glymidine sodium was marketed under several brand names, including Gondafon, Glycanol, Glyconormal, Lycanol, and Redul. It is now primarily sold by chemical suppliers for research purposes and is not widely available as a clinical medication. Its use has declined with the development of newer generations of sulfonylureas and other classes of antidiabetic drugs that offer different mechanisms of action and improved safety profiles.
