= Evogliptin =

Chemical compound

Clinical data
- Trade names: Suganon
- Other names: DA-1229
- Routes of administration: By mouth
- ATC code: A10BH07 (WHO)

Identifiers
- IUPAC name: (3R)-4-[(3R)-3-Amino-4-(2,4,5-trifluorophenyl)butanoyl]-3-{[(2-methyl-2-propanyl)oxy]methyl}-2-piperazinone
- CAS Number: 1222102-29-5
- PubChem CID: 25022354
- ChemSpider: 26339341
- UNII: 09118300L7
- KEGG: D11023
- ChEMBL: ChEMBL1779710
- CompTox Dashboard (EPA): DTXSID00153545

Chemical and physical data
- Formula: C_{19}H_{26}F_{3}N_{3}O_{3}
- Molar mass: 401.430 g·mol^{−1}
- 3D model (JSmol): Interactive image
- SMILES: CC(C)(C)OC[C@@H]1C(=O)NCCN1C(=O)C[C@@H](Cc2cc(c(cc2F)F)F)N
- InChI: InChI=1S/C19H26F3N3O3/c1-19(2,3)28-10-16-18(27)24-4-5-25(16)17(26)8-12(23)6-11-7-14(21)15(22)9-13(11)20/h7,9,12,16H,4-6,8,10,23H2,1-3H3,(H,24,27)/t12-,16-/m1/s1; Key:LCDDAGSJHKEABN-MLGOLLRUSA-N

Evogliptin (INN; trade names Suganon, Evodine) is an antidiabetic drug in the dipeptidyl peptidase-4 (DPP-4) inhibitor or "gliptin" class of drugs. It was developed by the South Korean pharmaceutical company Dong-A ST and is approved for use in South Korea and Russia. In a meta-analysis involving data from 6 randomized controlled trials (887 patients), Dutta et al. demonstrated the good glycaemic efficacy and safety of this medicine as compared to other DPP4 inhibitors like sitagliptin and linagliptin.
