= Glibornuride =

Names
- IUPAC name N-{[(1R,2R,3S,4S)-2-Hydroxybornan-3-yl]carbamoyl}-4-methylbenzene-1-sulfonamide
- Systematic IUPAC name N-{[(1S,2S,3R,4R)-3-Hydroxy-4,7,7-trimethylbicyclo[2.2.1]heptan-2-yl]carbamoyl}-4-methylbenzene-1-sulfonamide

Identifiers
CAS Number	26944-48-9
3D model (JSmol)	Interactive image
ChemSpider	16735831
DrugBank	DB08962
ECHA InfoCard	100.043.735
EC Number	248-124-6
KEGG	D02427
MeSH	C073323
PubChem CID	33649
UNII	VP83E7434R
CompTox Dashboard (EPA)	DTXSID001016937
- InChI: InChI=1S/C18H26N2O4S/c1-11-5-7-12(8-6-11)25(23,24)20-16(22)19-14-13-9-10-18(4,15(14)21)17(13,2)3/h5-8,13-15,21H,9-10H2,1-4H3,(H2,19,20,22)/t13-,14+,15+,18+/m1/s1 Key: RMTYNAPTNBJHQI-LLDVTBCESA-N; InChI=1/C18H26N2O4S/c1-11-5-7-12(8-6-11)25(23,24)20-16(22)19-14-13-9-10-18(4,15(14)21)17(13,2)3/h5-8,13-15,21H,9-10H2,1-4H3,(H2,19,20,22)/t13-,14+,15+,18+/m1/s1 Key: RMTYNAPTNBJHQI-LLDVTBCEBZ
- SMILES: CC1=CC=C(C=C1)S(=O)(=O)NC(=O)NC2C3CCC(C2O)(C3(C)C)C

Properties
Chemical formula	C_{18}H_{26}N_{2}O_{4}S
Molar mass	366.48 g/mol

Pharmacology
ATC code	A10BB04 (WHO)
- Except where otherwise noted, data are given for materials in their standard state (at 25 °C [77 °F], 100 kPa). verify (what is ?) Infobox references

Glibornuride (INN) is an anti-diabetic drug from the group of sulfonylureas. It is manufactured by MEDA Pharma and sold in Switzerland under the brand name Glutril.

== Synthesis ==
Glibornuride synthesis: See also: U.S. patent 3,770,761; eidem, U.S. patent 3,654,357 (to Hoffmann-La Roche).

Gliburnide is an endo-endo derivative made from camphor-3-carboxamide by borohydride reduction (exo approach), followed by Hofmann rearrangement to carbamate, followed by displacement with sodium tosylamide.
