= Canagliflozin/metformin =

Fixed-dose combination anti-diabetic medication

Combination of
- Canagliflozin: SGLT2 inhibitor
- Metformin: Biguanide

Clinical data
- Trade names: Vokanamet, Invokamet
- AHFS/Drugs.com: Monograph
- License data: US DailyMed: Invokamet
- Routes of administration: By mouth
- ATC code: A10BD16 (WHO)

Legal status
- Legal status: CA: ℞-only; UK: POM (Prescription only); US: ℞-only; EU: Rx-only; In general: ℞ (Prescription only)

Identifiers
- CAS Number: 2131792-63-5
- KEGG: D10587

Canagliflozin/metformin, sold under the brand name Vokanamet among others, is a fixed-dose combination anti-diabetic medication used for the treatment of type 2 diabetes. It is used in combination with diet and exercise. It is taken by mouth.

The most common side effects include hypoglycemia (low blood glucose levels) when used in combination with insulin or a sulphonylurea and vulvovaginal candidiasis (thrush, a fungal infection of the female genital area caused by Candida).

Canagliflozin/metformin was approved for medical use in the European Union in April 2014, and for use in the United States in August 2014.

== Medical uses ==
Canagliflozin/metformin is indicated in adults aged 18 years of age and older with type 2 diabetes as an adjunct to diet and exercise to improve glycemic control.

== Adverse effects ==
To lessen the risk of developing ketoacidosis (a serious condition in which the body produces high levels of blood acids called ketones) after surgery, the FDA approved changes to the prescribing information for SGLT2 inhibitor diabetes medicines to recommend they be stopped temporarily before scheduled surgery. Canagliflozin, dapagliflozin, and empagliflozin should each be stopped at least three days before, and ertugliflozin should be stopped at least four days before scheduled surgery.

Symptoms of ketoacidosis include nausea, vomiting, abdominal pain, tiredness, and trouble breathing.
