= Empagliflozin/metformin =

Pharmaceutical drug

Combination of
- Empagliflozin: SGLT2 inhibitor
- Metformin Hydrochloride: Anti-diabetic biguanide

Clinical data
- Trade names: Synjardy, Jardiamet
- AHFS/Drugs.com: Professional Drug Facts
- License data: US DailyMed: Synjardy
- Pregnancy category: AU: D
- Routes of administration: By mouth
- ATC code: A10BD20 (WHO)

Legal status
- Legal status: AU: S4 (Prescription only); CA: ℞-only; UK: POM (Prescription only); US: ℞-only; EU: Rx-only

Identifiers
- PubChem CID: 85364160
- KEGG: D10752
- ChEBI: CHEBI:90875

Chemical and physical data
- Formula: C_{27}H_{39}Cl_{2}N_{5}O_{7}
- Molar mass: 616.54 g·mol^{−1}
- 3D model (JSmol): Interactive image
- SMILES: CN(C)C(=N)N=C(N)N.COC1C(C(C(C(O1)C2=CC(=C(C=C2)Cl)CC3=CC=C(C=C3)OC4CCOC4)O)O)O.Cl
- InChI: InChI=1S/C23H27ClO7.C4H11N5.ClH/c1-28-23-21(27)19(25)20(26)22(31-23)14-4-7-18(24)15(11-14)10-13-2-5-16(6-3-13)30-17-8-9-29-12-17;1-9(2)4(7)8-3(5)6;/h2-7,11,17,19-23,25-27H,8-10,12H2,1H3;1-2H3,(H5,5,6,7,8);1H/t17-,19+,20+,21-,22-,23-;;/m0../s1; Key:YBRWIMHXUHRVDV-ZBYKXHQASA-N

Empagliflozin/metformin, sold under the brand name Synjardy among others, is a fixed-dose combination anti-diabetic medication used to treat type 2 diabetes. It contains empagliflozin and metformin hydrochloride. It is taken by mouth.

The most common side effects include hypoglycaemia (low blood sugar levels) when the medicine is taken with a sulphonylurea or insulin, infections of the urinary tract and genitals, and increased urination.

It was approved for use in the European Union in May 2015, for use in the United States in August 2015, and for use in Australia in May 2020. In 2020, it was the 238th most commonly prescribed medication in the United States, with more than 1 million prescriptions. It is available as a generic medication.

== Medical uses ==
In the European Union empagliflozin/metformin is indicated in adults aged 18 years and older with type 2 diabetes mellitus as an adjunct to diet and exercise to improve glycemic control:

- in adults inadequately controlled on their maximally tolerated dose of metformin alone;
- in adults inadequately controlled with metformin in combination with other glucose-lowering medicinal products, including insulin;
- in adults already being treated with the combination of empagliflozin and metformin as separate tablets.

In the United States it is also indicated to reduce the risk of cardiovascular death in adults with type 2 diabetes mellitus and established cardiovascular disease.

In June 2023, the US Food and Drug Administration (FDA) expanded the indication, as an addition to diet and exercise, to improve blood sugar control in children 10 years and older with type 2 diabetes.

== Society and culture ==
=== Legal status ===
Empagliflozin/metformin was approved for use in the European Union in May 2015.

Empagliflozin/metformin was approved for use in the United States in August 2015. The extended release version was approved for use in the United States in December 2016.

Empagliflozin/metformin was approved for use in Australia in May 2020.
