= Incretin mimetic =

Incretin mimetic can refer to any drug that mimics the actions of one or more incretin hormones. They are used for type 2 diabetes.

Specific incretin mimetics include:

- Dipeptidyl peptidase-4 inhibitor
- GLP-1 receptor agonist
