= Dapagliflozin/metformin =

Two drugs combined to treat diabetes

Combination of
- Dapagliflozin: SGLT2 inhibitor
- Metformin: Anti-diabetic biguanide

Clinical data
- Trade names: Xigduo, Xigduo Xr, Ebymect
- AHFS/Drugs.com: Professional Drug Facts
- License data: US DailyMed: Xigduo Xr
- Routes of administration: By mouth
- ATC code: A10BD15 (WHO)

Legal status
- Legal status: AU: S4 (Prescription only); CA: ℞-only; UK: POM (Prescription only); US: ℞-only; EU: Rx-only; In general: ℞ (Prescription only)

Identifiers
- CAS Number: 2446159-54-0
- PubChem CID: 85470863
- KEGG: D10586

Chemical and physical data
- Formula: C_{25}H_{37}Cl_{2}N_{5}O_{6}
- Molar mass: 574.50 g·mol^{−1}
- 3D model (JSmol): Interactive image
- SMILES: CCOC1=CC=C(C=C1)CC2=C(C=CC(=C2)C3C(C(C(C(O3)CO)O)O)O)Cl.CN(C)C(=N)N=C(N)N.Cl
- InChI: InChI=1S/C21H25ClO6.C4H11N5.ClH/c1-2-27-15-6-3-12(4-7-15)9-14-10-13(5-8-16(14)22)21-20(26)19(25)18(24)17(11-23)28-21;1-9(2)4(7)8-3(5)6;/h3-8,10,17-21,23-26H,2,9,11H2,1H3;1-2H3,(H5,5,6,7,8);1H/t17-,18-,19+,20-,21?;;/m1../s1; Key:IPQABJMJAWNGON-RFSZPCNPSA-N

Dapagliflozin/metformin, sold under the brand name Xigduo Xr among others, is a fixed-dose combination anti-diabetic medication used as an adjunct to diet and exercise to improve glycemic control in adults with type 2 diabetes. It is a combination of dapagliflozin and metformin and is taken by mouth. Dapagliflozin/metformin was approved for use in the European Union in January 2014, in the United States in February 2014, and in Australia in July 2014.

== Adverse effects ==
To lessen the risk of developing ketoacidosis (a serious condition in which the body produces high levels of blood acids called ketones) after surgery, the FDA has approved changes to the prescribing information for SGLT2 inhibitor diabetes medicines to recommend they be stopped temporarily before scheduled surgery. Canagliflozin, dapagliflozin, and empagliflozin should each be stopped at least three days before, and ertugliflozin should be stopped at least four days before scheduled surgery.

Symptoms of ketoacidosis include nausea, vomiting, abdominal pain, tiredness, and trouble breathing.

A potential interaction between dapagliflozin and lithium concomitant causing a reduction in serum lithium levels was bulletined in 2022.
