= Chiglitazar =

Chemical compound

Clinical data
- Trade names: Bilessglu
- Other names: Carfloglitazar

Legal status
- Legal status: Rx in China

Identifiers
- IUPAC name: (2S)-3-[4-(2-carbazol-9-ylethoxy)phenyl]-2-[2-(4-fluorobenzoyl)anilino]propanoic acid
- CAS Number: 743438-45-1
- PubChem CID: 71402018
- ChemSpider: 57523239
- UNII: E6EJV1J6Y0
- ChEMBL: ChEMBL4650349
- CompTox Dashboard (EPA): DTXSID00225352

Chemical and physical data
- Formula: C_{36}H_{29}FN_{2}O_{4}
- Molar mass: 572.636 g·mol^{−1}
- 3D model (JSmol): Interactive image
- SMILES: C1=CC=C2C(=C1)C3=CC=CC=C3N2CCOC4=CC=C(C=C4)C[C@@H](C(=O)O)NC5=CC=CC=C5C(=O)C6=CC=C(C=C6)F
- InChI: InChI=1S/C36H29FN2O4/c37-26-17-15-25(16-18-26)35(40)30-9-1-4-10-31(30)38-32(36(41)42)23-24-13-19-27(20-14-24)43-22-21-39-33-11-5-2-7-28(33)29-8-3-6-12-34(29)39/h1-20,32,38H,21-23H2,(H,41,42)/t32-/m0/s1; Key:QNLWMPLUWMWDMQ-YTTGMZPUSA-N

Chiglitazar (trade name Bilessglu) is a drug for the treatment of type 2 diabetes. It is a peroxisome proliferator-activated receptor (PPAR) agonist.

In China, chiglitazar is approved for glycemic control in adult patients with type 2 diabetes when used in combination with diet and exercise.
