= Dorzagliatin =

Clinical data
- Other names: Sinogliatin; HMS5552; HMS-5552

Identifiers
- IUPAC name: (2S)-2-[3-(2-Chlorophenoxy)-5-oxo-2H-pyrrol-1-yl]-N-[1-[(2R)-2,3-dihydroxypropyl]pyrazol-3-yl]-4-methylpentanamide
- CAS Number: 1191995-00-2
- PubChem CID: 57920094

Chemical and physical data
- Formula: C_{22}H_{27}ClN_{4}O_{5}
- Molar mass: 462.93 g·mol^{−1}

Dorzagliatin is a glucokinase activator that is being developed to treat diabetes. Unlike other diabetes drugs, it is intended to increase insulin sensitivity.
