= Insulin icodec =

Ultralong-acting basal insulin analogue

Clinical data
- Pronunciation: /ˌɪnsəlɪn ˈaɪkoʊdɛk/ IN-sə-lin EYE-koh-dek
- Trade names: Awiqli
- AHFS/Drugs.com: Monograph
- MedlinePlus: a626058
- Pregnancy category: AU: B3
- Routes of administration: Subcutaneous injection
- ATC code: A10AE07 (WHO)

Legal status
- Legal status: AU: S4 (Prescription only); CA: ℞-only / Schedule D; US: ℞-only; EU: Rx-only

Identifiers
- IUPAC name: (1a-21a),(1b-29b)-Insulin (human), 14a-L-glutamic acid-16b-L-histidine-25b-L-histidine-29b-(N6-(N-(19-carboxy-1-oxononadecyl)-L-gamma-glutamyl-2-(2-(2-aminoethoxy)ethoxy)acetyl-2-(2-(2-aminoethoxy)ethoxy)acetyl)-L-lysine)-
- CAS Number: 1188379-43-2
- PubChem CID: P7YU3ED05N
- DrugBank: DB16693
- UNII: P7YU3ED05N
- ChEMBL: ChEMBL4594581

Chemical and physical data
- Formula: C_{280}H_{435}N_{71}O_{87}S_{6}
- Molar mass: 6380.33 g·mol^{−1}

Insulin icodec, sold under the brand name Awiqli, is an ultralong-acting basal insulin analogue used in the treatment of diabetes. It is administered by subcutaneous injection once weekly. It was developed by Novo.

Insulin icodec was designed to provide basal insulin coverage with once-weekly dosing.

It is approved for medical use in Canada, the European Union, Australia, and in the United States.

== Medical uses ==
Insulin icodec is used as a basal insulin to improve glycemic control in adults with diabetes.

Indications vary by jurisdiction. In the United States, insulin icodec is indicated as an adjunct to diet and exercise to improve glycemic control in adults with type 2 diabetes. In the European Union, insulin icodec is authorized for adults with diabetes. In people with type 1 diabetes, it is indicated together with short-acting insulin to cover mealtime insulin requirements. In people with type 2 diabetes, it may be used alone or with other diabetes medicines, including short-acting insulin.

== Adverse effects ==
The most common adverse effect of insulin icodec is hypoglycemia.

== Chemistry ==
Insulin icodec is an acylated analogue of human insulin. Like human insulin, it consists of two peptide chains linked by disulfide bonds. It was engineered with three amino acid substitutions, A14E, B16H, and B25H, and a C20 icosane fatty diacid-containing side chain attached at lysine B29 through a hydrophilic linker. This side chain imparts strong, reversible binding to albumin. The amino acid substitutions provide molecular stability and attenuate insulin receptor binding, contributing to its longer duration of action.

== Society and culture ==
=== Legal status ===
Insulin icodec was approved for medical use in Canada in March 2024.

In March 2024, the Committee for Medicinal Products for Human Use of the European Medicines Agency adopted a positive opinion, recommending the granting of a marketing authorization for Awiqli, for diabetes. Insulin icodec was authorized for medical use in the European Union in May 2024.

In Australia, insulin icodec was approved in 2024.

Insulin icodec was approved for medical use in the United States in March 2026.

=== Names ===
Insulin icodec is the international nonproprietary name.

Insulin icodec is sold under the brand name Awiqli.

== Research ==
=== Pharmacology ===
Preclinical and early clinical pharmacology studies characterized insulin icodec as a basal insulin analogue. The molecular modifications were intended to create an albumin-bound circulating depot, while preserving insulin receptor-mediated metabolic activity and limiting mitogenic activity relative to human insulin.

=== Clinical trials ===
The phase 1 clinical pharmacology trial described by Nishimura and colleagues evaluated insulin icodec in people with type 2 diabetes using a randomized, double-blind, double-dummy, active-controlled, multiple-dose, dose-escalation design. The study reported a mean half-life of 196 hours and glucose-lowering activity distributed across the weekly dosing interval, supporting further development as a once-weekly basal insulin.

In ONWARDS 1, once-weekly insulin icodec was compared with once-daily insulin glargine U100 in adults with type 2 diabetes who had not previously used insulin. Insulin icodec was non-inferior, and statistically superior for reduction in glycated hemoglobin.

The phase III ONWARDS clinical trial program evaluated once-weekly insulin icodec in adults with diabetes. ONWARDS 3 compared weekly icodec with daily insulin degludec in insulin-naïve adults with type 2 diabetes. Icodec produced a greater reduction in glycated hemoglobin after 26 weeks, with low absolute rates of clinically significant or severe hypoglycemia in both groups.

ONWARDS 6 studied insulin icodec in adults with type 1 diabetes using a basal-bolus insulin regimen. Icodec was non-inferior to once-daily insulin degludec for reduction in glycated hemoglobin, but was associated with a higher rate of clinically significant or severe hypoglycemia.

A 2025 evidence summary for family physicians concluded that, in people with type 2 diabetes, weekly insulin icodec lowers hemoglobin A1c similarly to daily long-acting insulin glargine or degludec, while noting limited data in people or situations at higher risk for hypoglycemia.
