= Renal glucose reabsorption =

Physiological process in the kidney

Renal glucose reabsorption is the part of kidney (renal) physiology that deals with the retrieval of filtered glucose, preventing it from disappearing from the body through the urine.

If glucose is not reabsorbed by the kidney, it appears in the urine, in a condition known as glycosuria. This is associated with diabetes mellitus.

Firstly, the glucose in the proximal tubule is co-transported with sodium ions into the proximal convoluted tubule walls via the SGLT2 cotransporter. Some (typically smaller) amino acids are also transported in this way. Once in the tubule wall, the glucose and amino acids diffuse directly into the blood capillaries along a concentration gradient. This blood is flowing, so the gradient is maintained. Lastly, sodium/potassium ion active transport pumps remove sodium from the tubule wall and the sodium is put back into the blood. This maintains a sodium concentration gradient in the proximal tubule lining, so the first step continues to happen.

Gliflozins such as canagliflozin inhibit renal glucose reabsorption, and are used in diabetes mellitus to lower blood glucose.

== Overview table ==
Characteristics of glucose reabsorption
Characteristic	Proximal tubule			Loop of Henle	Distal convoluted tubule	Collecting duct system
Characteristic	S1	S2	S3	Loop of Henle	Distal convoluted tubule	Collecting duct system
Reabsorption (%)	98				Beyond the distal convoluted tubule: 2%	
Reabsorption (mmol/day)						
Concentration						
Apical transport proteins	SGLT2		SGLT1			
Basolateral transport proteins	GLUT2		GLUT1			
Other reabsorption features						
