= Metahexamide =

Names
- Preferred IUPAC name 3-Amino-N-(cyclohexylcarbamoyl)-4-methylbenzene-1-sulfonamide

Identifiers
CAS Number	565-33-3
3D model (JSmol)	Interactive image
ChEMBL	ChEMBL507419
ChemSpider	10785
ECHA InfoCard	100.008.434
KEGG	D07117
PubChem CID	11259
UNII	T3U6F5D722
CompTox Dashboard (EPA)	DTXSID3023267
- InChI: InChI=1S/C14H21N3O3S/c1-10-7-8-12(9-13(10)15)21(19,20)17-14(18)16-11-5-3-2-4-6-11/h7-9,11H,2-6,15H2,1H3,(H2,16,17,18) Key: XXYTXQGCRQLRHA-UHFFFAOYSA-N; InChI=1/C14H21N3O3S/c1-10-7-8-12(9-13(10)15)21(19,20)17-14(18)16-11-5-3-2-4-6-11/h7-9,11H,2-6,15H2,1H3,(H2,16,17,18) Key: XXYTXQGCRQLRHA-UHFFFAOYAB
- SMILES: CC1=C(C=C(C=C1)S(=O)(=O)NC(=O)NC2CCCCC2)N

Properties
Chemical formula	C_{14}H_{21}N_{3}O_{3}S
Molar mass	311.4 g/mol

Pharmacology
ATC code	A10BB10 (WHO)
- Except where otherwise noted, data are given for materials in their standard state (at 25 °C [77 °F], 100 kPa). verify (what is ?) Infobox references

Metahexamide (INN) is an anti-diabetic drug from the group of sulfonylureas. It is long-acting and belongs to the first-generation cyclohexyl-containing sulfonylureas. It was first described in 1959.
