= Dapagliflozin =

Diabetes medication

- Haworth projection (bottom)

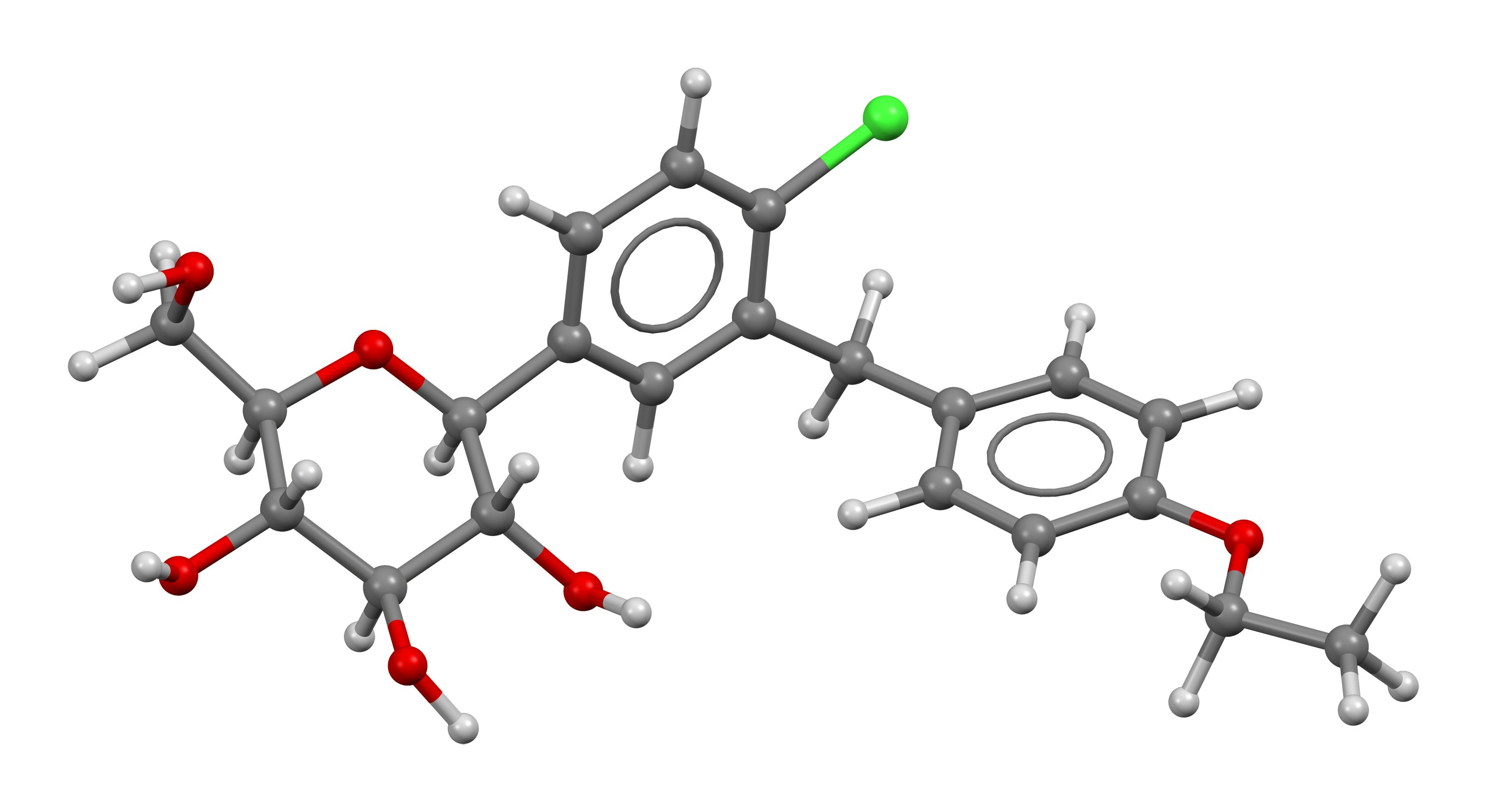

Clinical data
- Pronunciation: /ˌdæpəɡlɪˈfloʊzɪn/ DAP-ə-glif-LOH-zin
- Trade names: Farxiga, Forxiga, others
- Other names: BMS-512148; (1S)-1,5-anhydro-1-C-{4-chloro-3-[(4-ethoxyphenyl)methyl]phenyl}-D-glucitol
- AHFS/Drugs.com: Monograph
- MedlinePlus: a614015
- License data: US DailyMed: Dapagliflozin
- Pregnancy category: AU: D
- Routes of administration: By mouth
- Drug class: Sodium-glucose co-transporter 2 (SGLT2) inhibitor
- ATC code: A10BK01 (WHO)

Legal status
- Legal status: AU: S4 (Prescription only); CA: ℞-only; UK: POM (Prescription only); US: ℞-only; EU: Rx-only; In general: ℞ (Prescription only)

Pharmacokinetic data
- Bioavailability: 78% (after 10 mg dose)
- Protein binding: ~91%
- Metabolism: UGT1A9 (major), CYP (minor)
- Metabolites: Dapagliflozin 3-O-glucuronide (inactive)
- Elimination half-life: ~12.9 hours
- Excretion: Urine (75%), feces (21%)

Identifiers
- IUPAC name: (2S,3R,4R,5S,6R)-2-{4-chloro-3-[(4-ethoxyphenyl)methyl]phenyl}-6-(hydroxymethyl)oxane-3,4,5-triol
- CAS Number: 461432-26-8
- PubChem CID: 9887712
- IUPHAR/BPS: 4594
- DrugBank: DB06292
- ChemSpider: 8063384
- UNII: 1ULL0QJ8UC
- KEGG: D08897; as salt: D09763
- ChEBI: CHEBI:85078
- ChEMBL: ChEMBL429910
- CompTox Dashboard (EPA): DTXSID20905104
- ECHA InfoCard: 100.167.331

Chemical and physical data
- Formula: C_{21}H_{25}ClO_{6}
- Molar mass: 408.88 g·mol^{−1}
- 3D model (JSmol): Interactive image
- SMILES: CCOc1ccc(Cc2cc([C@@H]3O[C@H](CO)[C@@H](O)[C@H](O)[C@H]3O)ccc2Cl)cc1
- InChI: InChI=1S/C21H25ClO6/c1-2-27-15-6-3-12(4-7-15)9-14-10-13(5-8-16(14)22)21-20(26)19(25)18(24)17(11-23)28-21/h3-8,10,17-21,23-26H,2,9,11H2,1H3/t17-,18-,19+,20-,21+/m1/s1; Key:JVHXJTBJCFBINQ-ADAARDCZSA-N

Dapagliflozin, sold under the brand names Farxiga (US) and Forxiga (EU) among others, is a medication used to treat type 2 diabetes. It is also used to treat adults with heart failure and chronic kidney disease. It reversibly inhibits sodium-glucose co-transporter 2 (SGLT-2) in the renal proximal convoluted tubule to reduce glucose reabsorption and increase urinary glucose excretion.

Common side effects include hypoglycaemia (low blood sugar), urinary tract infections, genital infections, and volume depletion (reduced amount of water in the body). Diabetic ketoacidosis is a common side effect in people with type 1 diabetes. Serious but rare side effects include Fournier gangrene.

It was developed by Bristol-Myers Squibb in partnership with AstraZeneca. It is on the World Health Organization's List of Essential Medicines. In 2023, it was the 92nd most commonly prescribed medication in the United States, with more than 7 million prescriptions. Dapagliflozin is available as a generic medication.

== Medical uses ==
Dapagliflozin is used along with diet, exercise, and usually with other glucose-lowering medications, to improve glycaemic control in adults with type 2 diabetes. In addition, several clinical studies have demonstrated that dapagliflozin can slow the progression of kidney disease, lower the risk of kidney failure, and reduce the risk of death when used alongside standard treatments such as blood pressure medications. These benefits have been witnessed in patients with chronic kidney disease and/or heart disease, regardless of diabetes.

Guidelines including the European Society of Cardiology for Heart Failure and American Heart Association consider SGLT2 inhibitors such as dapagliflozin as standard therapy for people with heart failure with reduced ejection fraction, (LVEF < 40%). This is supported by two large, randomized, controlled trials and a 2023 systematic review and meta-analysis.

Evidence from multiple studies indicates that the addition of dapagliflozin and other sodium‑glucose cotransporter 2 (SGLT2) inhibitors to standard heart failure therapy can reduce the risk of worsening heart failure and hospitalisation for heart failure, regardless of the presence or absence of diabetes. A reduction in cardiovascular death is robust in heart failure with reduced ejection fraction (HFrEF), type 2 diabetes (T2DM), and chronic kidney disease (CKD), but less certain in heart failure with preserved ejection fraction (HFpEF) and acute myocardial infarction (MI). Large randomised controlled trials have shown that dapagliflozin significantly reduces worsening heart failure and heart failure hospitalisation across the spectrum of heart failure, including patients with reduced ejection fraction (LVEF <40%), mildly reduced ejection fraction (LVEF 41–49%) and preserved ejection fraction (LVEF ≥50%). Research shows that early initiation during hospitalization for acute heart failure appears safe in stable patients. Combined results of multiple trials also found that starting SGLT2 inhibitors in the hospital significantly lowers the risk of death from heart problems and prevents heart failure from getting worse. Dapagliflozin and other SGLT2 inhibitors may reduce hospitalisation for heart failure in Type 2 diabetic patients, with or without atherosclerotic cardiovascular disease,however evidence across these patient groups remains incomplete. Some meta-analyses and cohort studies have demonstrated consistent efficacy among SGLT2 inhibitors in reducing specific heart failure hospitalization, but there are no direct and definitive studies indicating the superiority of dapagliflozin over other SGLT2 inhibitors like empagliflozin and further studies are needed to support this claim Dapagliflozin has been associated with improved outcomes across the spectrum of frailty in patients with CKD, and a recent study reported a significantly lower risk of progression from prefrailty to frailty in older patients with hypertension and CKD. A randomized controlled trial is also evaluating whether combining dapagliflozin with exercise training improves physical function in adults with type 2 diabetes. In the European Union, dapagliflozin is indicated in adults for treatment of:

- Insufficiently controlled type 2 diabetes as an adjunct to diet and exercise
  - As monotherapy when metformin is considered inappropriate due to intolerance
  - In addition to other medicinal products for the treatment of type 2 diabetes
- Symptomatic chronic heart failure
- Chronic kidney disease

In November 2021, the European Medicines Agency (EMA) stated that dapagliflozin should no longer be used to treat type 1 diabetes.

=== Effects in nondiabetic chronic kidney disease ===
In 2021, the US Food and Drug Administration (FDA) and the EMA expanded the indications for dapagliflozin to include the treatment of people who have chronic kidney disease, but do not have diabetes.

Clinical trials have shown these effects of such a treatment:

The DIAMOND trial (2017–2019) in treatment periods of six weeks showed no improvement of excess proteins in the urine (proteinuria), a significant deterioration of the kidney's filtration rate (reversible within 6 weeks after dapagliflozin discontinuation), and a significant mean loss of body weight of 1.5 kg.

The DAPA-CKD trial (2017–2020) showed in a median treatment period of 2.4 years of participants who had already been under ACE inhibitor or angiotensin II receptor blocker therapy that the events of a sustained decline of 50% in the kidney's filtration rate, kidney failure, or death occurred statistically around eight months later in the treatment group than in the placebo group. In the first 12–16 months of treatment, but the kidney filtration rate was worse in the treatment group than in the placebo group, being slightly less negative in the treatment group than in the placebo group only thereafter.

== Adverse effects ==
Since dapagliflozin leads to heavy glycosuria (sometimes up to about 70 grams per day), it can lead to rapid weight loss and tiredness. The glucose acts as an osmotic diuretic (this effect is the cause of polyuria in diabetes), which can lead to dehydration. The increased amount of glucose in the urine can also worsen the infections already associated with diabetes, particularly urinary tract infections and thrush (candidiasis). Rarely, the use of an SGLT-2 inhibitor medication, including dapagliflozin, is associated with necrotizing fasciitis of the perineum, also called Fournier gangrene.

Dapagliflozin is also associated with hypotensive reactions. SGLT2 inhibitors, including dapagliflozin, are associated with a small but important risk of diabetic ketoacidosis, including euglycaemic diabetic ketoacidosis, where ketone levels increase despite normal or only mildly elevated blood glucose levels. However, the DEPICT-1 and DEPICT-2 trials showed that dapagliflozin caused additional diabetic ketoacidosis events in the type 1 diabetic patients who received dapagliflozin. Symptoms of ketoacidosis include nausea, vomiting, abdominal pain, fatigue, and trouble breathing.

Dapagliflozin can cause dehydration, serious urinary tract infections, and genital yeast infections. Elderly people and people with kidney dysfunction, low blood pressure, or who are on diuretic medications should have their volume status and kidney function assessed. Individuals with signs and symptoms of metabolic acidosis or ketoacidosis should also be assessed. Dapagliflozin can cause low blood sugar when combined with insulin.

To lessen the risk of developing ketoacidosis after surgery, the US FDA approved changes to the prescribing information for SGLT-2 inhibitors to recommend they be stopped temporarily before scheduled surgery. Canagliflozin, dapagliflozin, and empagliflozin should each be stopped at least three days before, and ertugliflozin should be stopped at least four days before scheduled surgery.

The glucose-lowering effect of dapagliflozin starts to diminish in people with chronic kidney disease with reduced kidney function (eGFR <45mL/min) and may not be as effective for glycemic control. However, studies have demonstrated a renoprotective effect in reducing kidney function decline, dapagliflozin can still be used to reduce kidney function decline regardless of diabetes status. Therefore, while dapagliflozin can be used in people with diabetes and chronic kidney disease to prevent kidney function decline, further interventions may be needed for glycemic control.

== Chemistry ==
The first synthesis of dapagliflozin was disclosed in a patent filed by Bristol Myers Squibb in 2002.

Synthesis of dapaglifloxin

The two main carbon-containing fragments are combined by the reaction of an aryl lithium with a trimethylsilyl-protected gluconolactone. The trimethylsilyl groups are then removed by treatment with methanesulfonic acid in methanol. This gives an intermediate with an unwanted methoxy group at the anomeric centre, which is removed by reaction with triethylsilane in the presence of boron trifluoride etherate. This route, as well as others developed for the manufacture of the drug, have been reviewed.

== Mechanism of action ==
Dapagliflozin inhibits subtype 2 of the sodium-glucose transport proteins (SGLT2), which are responsible for at least 90% of the glucose reabsorption in the kidney. Blocking this transporter mechanism causes blood glucose to be eliminated through the urine. In combination with metformin, dapagliflozin at standard treatment dose of 10 mg daily lowered HbA1c by 0.54-0.84% (5.9-9.3 mmol/mol) when compared to metformin monotherapy in patients with inadequately controlled type 2 diabetes and normal renal function.

Its protective effects in heart failure are attributed primarily to haemodynamic effects, where SGLT2 inhibitors potently reduce intravascular volume through osmotic diuresis and natriuresis. This consequently may lead to a reduction in preload and afterload, thereby alleviating cardiac workload and improving left ventricular function.

=== Selectivity ===
The IC_{50} for SGLT2 is less than one-thousandth of the IC_{50} for SGLT1 (1.1 versus 1390 nmol/L), so that the drug does not interfere with intestinal glucose absorption.

== Names ==
Dapagliflozin is the international nonproprietary name (INN), and the United States Adopted Name (USAN).

The fixed-dose combination product, dapagliflozin/metformin extended-release, is sold under the brand name Xigduo XR.

In July 2016, the fixed-dose combination of saxagliptin and dapagliflozin was authorized for medical use in the European Union and is sold under the brand name Qtern. The combination drug was approved for medical use in the United States in February 2017, where it also is sold under the brand name Qtern.

In May 2019, the fixed-dose combination of dapagliflozin, saxagliptin, and metformin hydrochloride as extended-release tablets was approved in the United States to improve glycemic control in adults with type 2 diabetes when used in combination with diet and exercise. The FDA granted the approval of Qternmet XR to AstraZeneca. The combination drug was authorized for use in the European Union in November 2019, and is sold under the brand name Qtrilmet.

== History ==
In 2012, the Committee for Medicinal Products for Human Use (CHMP) of the EMA issued a positive opinion on the drug.

Dapagliflozin was found effective in several studies in participants with type 2 diabetes. The main measure of effectiveness was the level of glycated haemoglobin (HbA_{1c}), which indicates how well blood glucose is controlled.

In two studies involving 840 participants with type 2 diabetes, dapagliflozin when used alone decreased HbA_{1c} levels by 0.66% more than placebo (a dummy treatment) after 24 weeks. In four other studies involving 2,370 participants, adding dapagliflozin to other diabetes medicines decreased HbA_{1c} levels by 0.54–0.68% more than adding placebo after 24 weeks.

In a study involving 814 participants with type 2 diabetes, dapagliflozin used in combination with metformin was at least as effective as a sulphonylurea (another type of diabetes medicine) used with metformin. Both combinations reduced HbA_{1c} levels by 0.52% after 52 weeks.

A long-term study, involving over 17,000 participants with type 2 diabetes, looked at the effects of dapagliflozin on cardiovascular (heart and circulation) disease. The study indicated that dapagliflozin's effects were in line with those of other diabetes medicines that also work by blocking SGLT2.

In two studies involving 1,648 participants with type 1 diabetes whose blood sugar was not controlled well enough on insulin alone, adding dapagliflozin 5 mg decreased HbA_{1c} levels after 24 hours by 0.37% and by 0.42% more than adding placebo.

Dapagliflozin was authorized for medical use in the European Union in November 2012. It is sold in a number of European countries.

Dapagliflozin was approved for medical use in the United States in January 2014.

In 2020, the US FDA expanded the indications for dapagliflozin to include treatment for adults with heart failure with reduced ejection fraction to reduce the risk of cardiovascular death and hospitalization for heart failure. It is the first in this particular drug class, sodium-glucose co-transporter 2 inhibitors, to be approved to treat adults with New York Heart Association's functional class II-IV heart failure with reduced ejection fraction.

In the DAPA‑HF clinical trial, when dapagliflozin was added to standard therapy in adults with symptomatic heart failure and reduced ejection fraction, the risk of worsening heart failure or cardiovascular death was reduced. It also reduced the risk of death from any cause (approximately 17% lower risk) compared with placebo over an average of about 18 months. In DECLARE‑TIMI 58, a clinical trial which included adults with type 2 diabetes and cardiovascular risk, dapagliflozin reduced heart failure hospitalisations and improved the combined outcome of death from a heart related cause or heart failure hospitalisation. However, dapagliflozin did not reduce the overall number of deaths from any cause compared with placebo when all participants were considered together.

The safety and effectiveness of dapagliflozin were evaluated in a randomized, double-blind, placebo-controlled study of 4,744 participants. The average age of participants was 66 years and more participants were male (77%) than female. To determine the drug's effectiveness, investigators examined the occurrence of cardiovascular death, hospitalization for heart failure, and urgent heart failure visits. Participants were randomly assigned to receive a once-daily dose of either 10 mg of dapagliflozin or a placebo (inactive treatment). After about 18 months, people who received dapagliflozin had fewer cardiovascular deaths, hospitalizations for heart failure, and urgent heart-failure visits than those receiving the placebo.

In July 2020, the FDA granted AstraZeneca a Fast Track Designation in the US for the development of dapagliflozin to reduce the risk of hospitalization for heart failure or cardiovascular death in adults following a heart attack.

In August 2020, detailed results from the Phase III DAPA-CKD trial reportedly showed that dapagliflozin on top of standard of care reduced the composite measure of worsening of renal function or risk of cardiovascular or renal death by 39% compared to placebo (p<0.0001) in patients with chronic kidney disease stages 2–4 and elevated urinary albumin excretion. The results were consistent in patients both with and without type 2 diabetes.

In April 2021, the FDA expanded the indications for dapagliflozin to include reducing the risk of kidney function decline, kidney failure, cardiovascular death, and hospitalization for heart failure in adults with chronic kidney disease who are at risk of disease progression. The efficacy of dapagliflozin to improve kidney outcomes and reduce cardiovascular death in people with chronic kidney disease was evaluated in a multicenter, double-blind study of 4,304 participants.

In February 2023, the EU authorized dapagliflozin for extended use to cover heart failure patients across the full spectrum of left ventricular ejection fraction (LVEF), including those with mildly reduced and preserved ejection fraction.

== Society and culture ==
=== Legal status ===
A generic version of dapagliflozin was approved by the US FDA in February 2022, but cannot be sold until October 2025. A generic version was approved in Canada in May 2023.

In January 2023, the CHMP of the EMA adopted a positive opinion, recommending the granting of a marketing authorization for a generic version of Forxiga, which has been authorized in the EU since November 2012. Dapagliflozin Viatris was authorized for medical use in the European Union in March 2023.

== Research ==
A systematic review concluded that dapagliflozin reduced heart failure hospitalization, cardiovascular death, and all-cause mortality in people with HFrEF and diabetes.
