= Finafloxacin =

Chemical compound

Clinical data
- Trade names: Xtoro
- Routes of administration: otic, oral, intavenous
- ATC code: None

Legal status
- Legal status: CA: ℞-only; US: ℞-only

Pharmacokinetic data
- Elimination half-life: 10 hours

Identifiers
- IUPAC name: 8-Cyano-1-cyclopropyl-6-fluoro-7-[(4aS,7aS)-hexahydropyrrolo[3,4-b][1,4]oxazin-6(2H)-yl]-4-oxo-1,4-dihydro-3-quinolinecarboxylic acid
- CAS Number: 209342-40-5
- PubChem CID: 11567473
- ChemSpider: 9742243
- UNII: D26OSN9Q4R
- KEGG: D10575
- ChEBI: CHEBI:85176
- ChEMBL: ChEMBL1908370
- CompTox Dashboard (EPA): DTXSID10175096

Chemical and physical data
- Formula: C_{20}H_{19}FN_{4}O_{4}
- Molar mass: 398.394 g·mol^{−1}
- 3D model (JSmol): Interactive image
- SMILES: O=C(O)C1=CN(C2CC2)c3c(C1=O)cc(F)c(c3C#N)N4C[C@H]5[C@H](C4)NCCO5
- InChI: InChI=1S/C20H19FN4O4/c21-14-5-11-17(25(10-1-2-10)7-13(19(11)26)20(27)28)12(6-22)18(14)24-8-15-16(9-24)29-4-3-23-15/h5,7,10,15-16,23H,1-4,8-9H2,(H,27,28)/t15-,16-/m0/s1; Key:FYMHQCNFKNMJAV-HOTGVXAUSA-N

Finafloxacin (Xtoro) is a fluoroquinolone antibiotic. In the United States, it is approved by the Food and Drug Administration to treat acute otitis externa (swimmer's ear) caused by the bacteria Pseudomonas aeruginosa and Staphylococcus aureus.

== Medical uses ==
Finafloxacin is used to treat a type of ear infection called acute otitis externa caused by Pseudomonas aeruginosa and Staphylococcus aureus bacteria. In the clinical trial that led to the drug's approval, finafloxacin shortened the time to cessation of ear pain from an average of 6.8 days in patients taking a placebo to 3.5 days.

Finafloxacin cannot be purchased over-the-counter, and is available by prescription only.

=== Available forms ===
Finafloxacin is commercially available as a 0.3% otic (meaning "for the ear") suspension for topical administration in the United States. The suspension should be warmed gently in the hands for 1–2 minutes before administration to prevent dizziness, and shaken before use. It is necessary to remain still for 1 minute, with the affected ear facing up while lying on one's side, after administration to allow finafloxacin to penetrate the ear canal and reach the site of infection.

=== Specific populations ===
==== Pregnancy ====
Finafloxacin is classified as pregnancy category C, meaning that the risk for harming a developing fetus has not been ruled out.

==== Pediatrics ====
The efficacy and safety profile of finafloxacin ear drops are unknown in children younger than the age of 1 years old.

==== Geriatrics ====
There are no limitations against using finafloxacin ear drops in the elderly.

== Adverse effects ==
The spectrum of adverse effects caused by finafloxacin vary by the method of administration. People that have administered finafloxacin into their ears in the form of drops have experienced ear itching and nausea (<1% for both). People that have administered finafloxacin by mouth or intravenously (IV) have experienced gastrointestinal side effects (including diarrhea, flatulence, and nausea), fatigue, headaches, musculoskeletal problems, and injection site reactions (if IV). Respiratory disorders, including rhinitis and nasopharyngitis, have also been associated with the use of finafloxacin.

People that are allergic to other quinolones may be allergic to finafloxacin as well, and use may result in an allergic reaction in that population. Adverse effects consistent with an allergic reaction to finafloxacin may include swelling of the lips, tongue, or throat, difficulty swallowing, and shortness of breath.

== Overdose ==
It is not thought that an overdose of the otic suspension is likely to cause severe or life-threatening symptoms.

== Interactions ==
Owing to the local effect of administering finafloxacin into the ears, it is unlikely that it will affect or be affected by other medications that are administered into the systemic circulation (e.g. drugs taken by mouth, or by injection).

== Pharmacology ==
=== Mechanism of action ===
Finafloxacin is a fluoroquinolone class antibiotic of the 8-cyano subclass (referring to the CN substituent at the 8th position). Like other fluoroquinolones, its antibiotic activity is derived from its pharmacological mechanism of action as a type II topoisomerase poison, preventing bacteria from replicating and performing other vital, cellular functions. However, unlike other fluoroquinolones, finafloxacin is highly active under acidic (pH 5.0–6.0) conditions, where certain bacteria (like Helicobacter pylori, a bacterium that is known to infect the human stomach, despite the harsh acidity) thrive. Other acidic conditions found on the human body include the vagina, urinary tract, and skin, though finafloxacin is currently not used to treat infections in these areas either.

Finafloxacin has demonstrated bactericidal activity against a range of bacterial pathogens, especially at acidic pH, with a post-antibiotic effect. Owing to its activity against both Gram-positive and Gram-negative bacteria, finafloxacin is classified as a broad-spectrum antibiotic.

=== Pharmacokinetics ===
Finafloxacin has good oral bioavailability, meaning that a substantial portion of a dose taken by mouth reaches a person's systemic circulation. Some people have experienced unintentional, quantifiable absorption of finafloxacin into systemic circulation after administering the drug via the ear.

The elimination half-life of finafloxacin is approximately 10 hours in humans.

== Chemistry ==
The chemical structure of finafloxacin has been described as a "fluorinated quinolone derivative with 8-cyano-substituent and 7-pyrrolo-oxazinyl moiety." Its low isoelectric point (pH 6.7) is lower than the isoelectric point of another fluoroquinolone class antibiotic called ciprofloxacin (pH 7.4), which accounts for finafloxacin's superior activity at low pH (5.0–6.0).

There are some notable differences between the chemistry of finafloxacin and related fluoroquinolones. For example, the 8-cyano-substituent is not found in ciprofloxacin, and moxifloxacin has an 8-methoxy-substituent instead. The oxygen atom in the ring structure of finafloxacin makes the molecule more hydrophilic than ciprofloxacin.

The chemical structure of finafloxacin is nearly identical to that of pradofloxacin.

=== Synthesis ===
The synthesis of finafloxacin has been described in detail in its patents. An example of its synthesis is provided below:

== History ==
Finafloxacin is the first FDA approved medication in the United States that was first developed by a Singaporean drug company. Finafloxacin was officially approved by the FDA on 17 December 2014. The company, MerLion Pharmaceuticals, partnered with the North American company Alcon to produce the drug commercially in the United States.

== Research ==
Owing to its high bactericidal activity in acidic environments, Bartoletti et al have speculated that finafloxacin may be useful in the treatment of urinary tract infections in the future. Finafloxacin's manufacturer, MerLion, has invested money in studying the use of finafloxacin for this indication.
