= Insulin degludec/liraglutide =

Pharmaceutical drug

Combination of
- Insulin degludec: Insulin analog
- Liraglutide: Glucagon-like peptide-1 receptor agonist (GLP-1)

Clinical data
- Trade names: Xultophy
- AHFS/Drugs.com: Professional Drug Facts
- License data: US DailyMed: Insulin degludec and liraglutide
- Pregnancy category: AU: B3
- Routes of administration: Subcutaneous
- ATC code: A10AE56 (WHO)

Legal status
- Legal status: AU: S4 (Prescription only); CA: ℞-only / Schedule D; UK: POM (Prescription only); US: ℞-only; EU: Rx-only

Identifiers
- KEGG: D11567

Insulin degludec/liraglutide, sold under the brand name Xultophy, is a fixed-dose combination medication for the treatment of adults with type 2 diabetes to improve glycemic control in combination with diet and exercise. It contains insulin degludec and liraglutide. It is administered by subcutaneous injection.

The most common side effects include hypoglycaemia (low blood glucose). Side effects on the digestive system include nausea (feeling sick), diarrhea, vomiting, constipation, dyspepsia (indigestion), gastritis (inflammation of the stomach), abdominal pain (stomach ache), flatulence (wind), gastroesophageal reflux disease (passage of stomach acid back up towards the mouth), and distension (swelling) of the belly.

Insulin degludec is a replacement insulin that acts in the same way as naturally produced insulin and helps glucose enter cells from the blood. By controlling the level of blood glucose, the symptoms and complications of diabetes are reduced. Insulin degludec is slightly different from human insulin as it is absorbed more slowly and regularly by the body after an injection and it works for a long time.

Liraglutide belongs to the class of diabetes medicines known as GLP-1 receptor agonists It acts in the same way as incretins (hormones produced in the gut) by increasing the amount of insulin that the pancreas releases in response to food. This helps with the control of blood glucose levels.

== History ==
Insulin degludec/liraglutide was approved for medical use in the European Union in September 2014, and in the United States in November 2016.
