= Glimepiride =

Medication

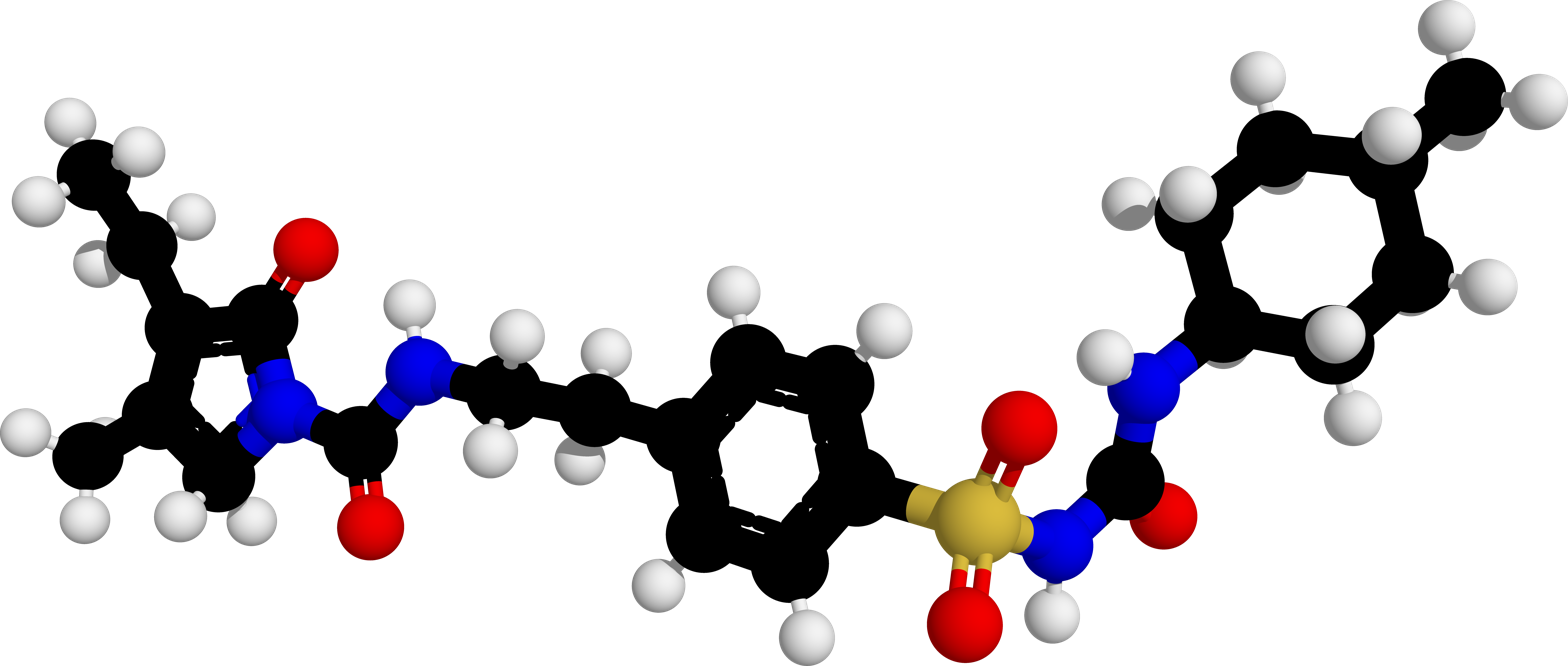

Clinical data
- Trade names: Amaryl, others
- AHFS/Drugs.com: Monograph
- MedlinePlus: a696016
- License data: US DailyMed: Glimepiride
- Pregnancy category: AU: C
- Routes of administration: By mouth
- ATC code: A10BB12 (WHO)

Legal status
- Legal status: AU: S4 (Prescription only); US: ℞-only; In general: ℞ (Prescription only)

Pharmacokinetic data
- Bioavailability: 100%
- Protein binding: >99.5%
- Metabolism: Complete Liver (1st stage through CYP2C9)
- Onset of action: 2–3 hours
- Elimination half-life: 5–8 hours
- Duration of action: 24 hours
- Excretion: Urine (~60%), feces (~40%)

Identifiers
- IUPAC name: 3-Ethyl-4-methyl-N-[2-(4-{[(trans-4-methylcyclohexyl)carbamoyl]sulfamoyl}phenyl)ethyl]-2-oxo-2,5-dihydro-1H-pyrrole-1-carboxamide
- CAS Number: 93479-97-1
- PubChem CID: 3476
- IUPHAR/BPS: 6820
- DrugBank: DB00222
- ChemSpider: 16740595
- UNII: 6KY687524K
- KEGG: D00593
- ChEBI: CHEBI:5383
- ChEMBL: ChEMBL1481
- CompTox Dashboard (EPA): DTXSID5040675
- ECHA InfoCard: 100.170.771

Chemical and physical data
- Formula: C_{24}H_{34}N_{4}O_{5}S
- Molar mass: 490.62 g·mol^{−1}
- 3D model (JSmol): Interactive image
- Melting point: 207 °C (405 °F)
- SMILES: O=C3C(/CC)=C(/C)CN3C(=O)NCCc1ccc(cc1)S(=O)(=O)NC(=O)N[C@H]2CC[C@H](C)CC2
- InChI: InChI=1S/C24H34N4O5S/c1-4-21-17(3)15-28(22(21)29)24(31)25-14-13-18-7-11-20(12-8-18)34(32,33)27-23(30)26-19-9-5-16(2)6-10-19/h7-8,11-12,16,19H,4-6,9-10,13-15H2,1-3H3,(H,25,31)(H2,26,27,30)/t16-,19-; Key:WIGIZIANZCJQQY-RUCARUNLSA-N

Glimepiride is an antidiabetic medication within the sulfonylurea class, primarily prescribed for the management of type 2 diabetes. It is regarded as a second-line option compared to metformin, due to metformin's well-established safety and efficacy. Use of glimepiride is recommended in conjunction with lifestyle modifications such as diet and exercise. It is taken by mouth, reaching a peak effect within three hours and lasting for about a day.

Common side effects include headache, nausea, and dizziness. Serious side effects may include low blood sugar. Use during pregnancy and breastfeeding is not recommended. It works predominantly by increasing the amount of insulin released from the pancreas. It is classified as a second-generation sulfonylurea.

Glimepiride was patented in 1979 and approved for medical use in 1995. It is available as a generic medication. In 2023, it was the 80th most commonly prescribed medication in the United States, with more than 8 million prescriptions.

== Medical uses ==
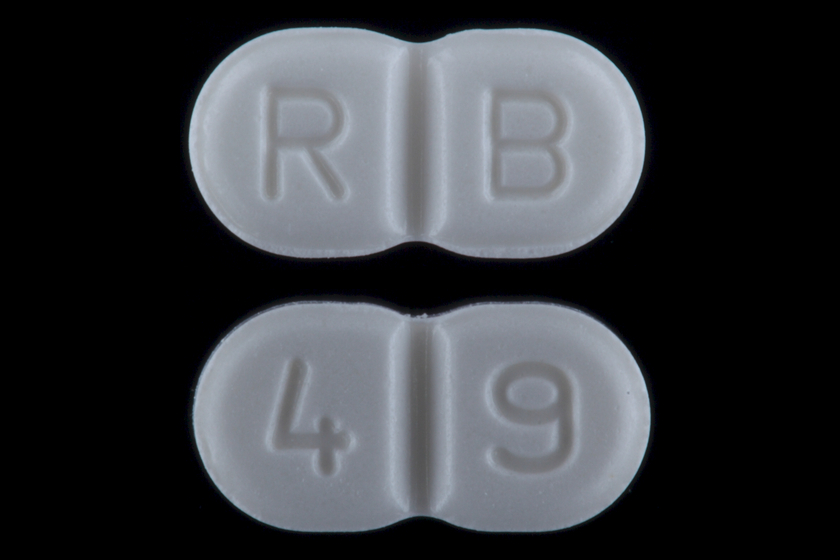
Two generic oral tablets of glimepiride, 2 mg each

Glimepiride is indicated to treat type 2 diabetes; its mode of action is to increase insulin secretion by the pancreas. However it requires adequate insulin synthesis as prerequisite to treat appropriately. It is not used for type 1 diabetes because in type 1 diabetes the pancreas is not able to produce insulin.

== Contraindications ==
Its use is contraindicated in patients with hypersensitivity to glimepiride or other sulfonylureas.

== Adverse effects ==
Side effects from taking glimepiride include gastrointestinal tract (GI) disturbances, occasional allergic reactions, and rarely blood production disorders including thrombocytopenia, leukopenia, and hemolytic anemia. In the initial weeks of treatment, the risk of hypoglycemia may be increased. Alcohol consumption and exposure to sunlight should be restricted because they can worsen side effects.

== Interactions ==
Nonsteroidal anti-inflammatory drugs (such as salicylates), sulfonamides, chloramphenicol, warfarin and probenecid may potentiate the hypoglycemic action of glimepiride. Thiazides, other diuretics, phothiazides, thyroid products, oral contraceptives, and phenytoin tend to produce hyperglycemia.

== Mechanism of action ==
Like all sulfonylureas, glimepiride acts as an insulin secretagogue. It lowers blood sugar by stimulating the release of insulin by pancreatic beta cells and by inducing increased activity of intracellular insulin receptors.

Not all secondary sulfonylureas have the same risk of hypoglycemia. Glibenclamide (glyburide) is associated with an incidence of hypoglycemia of up to 20–30%, compared to as low as 2% to 4% with glimepiride. Glibenclamide also interferes with the normal homeostatic suppression of insulin secretion in reaction to hypoglycemia, whereas glimepiride does not. Also, glibenclamide diminishes glucagon secretion in reaction to hypoglycemia, whereas glimepiride does not.

== Pharmacokinetics ==
Gastrointestinal absorption is complete, with no interference from meals. Significant absorption can occur within one hour, and distribution is throughout the body, 99.5% bound to plasma protein. Metabolism is by oxidative biotransformation, it is hepatic and complete. First, the medication is metabolized to M_{1} metabolite by CYP2C9. M_{1} possesses about 1/3 of pharmacological activity of glimepiride, yet it is unknown if this results in clinically meaningful effect on blood glucose. M_{1} is further metabolized to M_{2} metabolite by cytosolic enzymes. M_{2} is pharmacologically inactive. Excretion in the urine is about 65%, and the remainder is excreted in the feces.
