= Enavogliflozin =

Chemical compound

Clinical data
- Other names: DWP16001
- ATC code: A10BK09 (WHO)

Identifiers
- IUPAC name: (2S,3R,4R,5S,6R)-2-{7-chloro-6-[(4-cyclopropylphenyl)methyl]-2,3-dihydro-1-benzofuran-4-yl}-6-(hydroxymethyl)oxane-3,4,5-triol
- CAS Number: 1415472-28-4
- PubChem CID: 71076840
- ChemSpider: 58891640
- UNII: Z5MR2Y1IJJ
- KEGG: D13015
- ChEMBL: ChEMBL3703921

Chemical and physical data
- Formula: C_{24}H_{27}ClO_{6}
- Molar mass: 446.92 g·mol^{−1}
- 3D model (JSmol): Interactive image
- SMILES: OC[C@H]1O[C@@H](c2cc(Cc3ccc(C4CC4)cc3)c(Cl)c3c2CCO3)[C@H](O)[C@@H](O)[C@@H]1O
- InChI: InChI=1S/C24H27ClO6/c25-19-15(9-12-1-3-13(4-2-12)14-5-6-14)10-17(16-7-8-30-23(16)19)24-22(29)21(28)20(27)18(11-26)31-24/h1-4,10,14,18,20-22,24,26-29H,5-9,11H2/t18-,20-,21+,22-,24+/m1/s1; Key:KORCWPOBTZTAFI-YVTYUBGGSA-N

Enavogliflozin (DWP16001/GCC5694A) is a selective SLC5A2 and SGLT2 inhibitor developed to treat diabetes and obesity. It was developed by GC Pharma and Daewoong Pharmaceutical.

Enavogliflozin has been approved for clinical use in South Korea, and Ecuador, and applied for approval in Brazil, Mexico, Peru, and Colombia.

In a meta-analysis published by Dutta et al. analysing data from 4 trials over 6 months of clinical use, enavogliflozin was well tolerated and was found to be effective for managing type 2 diabetes and may be superior to dapagliflozin with regard to certain clinical aspects
