= SGLT2 inhibitor =

Class of medication

SGLT2 inhibitors (also called gliflozins or flozins) are a class of medications that inhibit sodium-glucose transport proteins in the nephron (the functional units of the kidney), unlike SGLT1 inhibitors that perform a similar function in the intestinal mucosa. The foremost metabolic effect of this is to inhibit reabsorption of glucose in the kidney and therefore lower blood sugar. They act by inhibiting sodium/glucose cotransporter 2 (SGLT2). SGLT2 inhibitors are used in the treatment of type 2 diabetes. Apart from blood sugar control, gliflozins have been shown to provide significant cardiovascular benefit in people with type 2 diabetes. As of 2014, several medications of this class had been approved or were under development. In studies on canagliflozin, a member of this class, the medication was found to enhance blood sugar control as well as reduce body weight and systolic and diastolic blood pressure.

== Medical uses ==
The 2022 American Diabetes Association (ADA) standards of medical care in diabetes include SGLT2 inhibitors as a first line pharmacological therapy for type 2 diabetes (usually together with metformin), specifically in patients with chronic kidney disease, cardiovascular disease or heart failure.

A systematic review and network meta-analysis comparing SGLT-2 inhibitors, GLP-1 agonists, and DPP-4 inhibitors demonstrated that use of SGLT2 inhibitors was associated with a 1% reduction in death compared with placebo or no treatment. Another systematic review discussed the mechanisms by which SGLT-2 inhibitors improve cardio-renal function in patients with type 2 diabetes, emphasizing the impacts in improving neural tone.

A meta-analysis including 13 cardiovascular outcome trials found that SGLT-2 inhibitors reduce the risk for three-point major adverse cardiovascular events (MACE), especially in subjects with an estimated glomerular filtration rate (eGFR) below 60 ml/min, whereas GLP-1 receptor agonists were more beneficial in persons with higher eGFR. Likewise, the risk reduction due to SGLT-2 inhibitors was larger in populations with a higher proportion of albuminuria, but this relationship was not observed for GLP-1 receptor agonists. This suggests a differential use of the two substance classes in patients with preserved and reduced renal function or with and without diabetic nephropathy, respectively.

Two reviews have concluded that SGLT2 inhibitors benefit patients with atherosclerotic major adverse cardiovascular events. One of those studies defined MACE as the composite of myocardial infarction, stroke, or cardiovascular death.

SGLT2 inhibitors possess prodiuretic properties.

== Adverse effects ==
Genital infections seem to be the most common adverse effect of gliflozins. In clinical trials fungal infections, urinary tract infections and osmotic diuresis were higher in patients treated with gliflozins.

In May 2015, the FDA issued a warning that gliflozins can increase risk of diabetic ketoacidosis (DKA, a serious condition in which the body produces high levels of blood acids called ketones). By reducing glucose blood circulation, gliflozins cause less stimulation of endogenous insulin secretion or lower dose of exogenous insulin that results in diabetic ketoacidosis. They can specifically cause euglycemic DKA (euDKA, DKA where the blood sugar is not elevated) because of the renal tubular absorption of ketone bodies. A particularly high risk period for ketoacidosis is the perioperative period. SGLT2 inhibitors may need to be discontinued before surgery, and are only recommended when someone is not unwell, is adequately hydrated, and can consume a regular diet. Symptoms of ketoacidosis include nausea, vomiting, abdominal pain, tiredness, and trouble breathing. To lessen the risk of developing ketoacidosis after surgery, the FDA has approved changes to the prescribing information for SGLT2 inhibitor diabetes medicines to recommend they be stopped temporarily before scheduled surgery. Canagliflozin, dapagliflozin, and empagliflozin should each be stopped at least three days before, and ertugliflozin should be stopped at least four days before scheduled surgery.

In September 2015, the FDA issued a warning related to canagliflozin (Invokana) and canagliflozin/metformin (Invokamet) due to decreased bone mineral density and therefore increased risk of bone fractures. Using gliflozins in combination therapy with metformin can lower the risk of hypoglycemia compared to other type 2 diabetes treatments such as sulfonylureas and insulin.

Increased risk of lower limb amputation is associated with canagliflozin, but further data is needed to confirm this risk associated with different gliflozins. A European Medicines Agency review concluded that there is a potential increased risk of lower limb amputation (mostly affecting the toes) in people taking canagliflozin, dapagliflozin and empagliflozin.

In August 2018, the FDA issued a warning of an increased risk of Fournier gangrene in patients using SGLT2 inhibitors. The absolute risk is considered very low.

In the FDA Adverse Event Reporting System an increase was reported in events of acute kidney injury associated with SGLT2 inhibitors, though data from clinical trials actually showed a reduction in such events with SGLT-2 treatment.

== Interactions ==
Interactions are important for SGLT2 inhibitors because most people with type 2 diabetes are taking many other medications. Gliflozins appear to increase the diuretic effect of thiazides, loop diuretics and related diuretics and may increase the risk of dehydration and hypotension. It is important to adjust the dose of antidiabetics if the treatment is combination therapy to avoid hypoglycemia. For example, interactions with sulfonylureas have led to severe hypoglycemia presumably due to cytochrome P450.

== Members ==
Some members of the gliflozin class:

- Bexagliflozin was approved in the United States under the brand name Brenzavvy in January 2023.
- Canagliflozin is the first SGLT2 inhibitor to be approved for use in the United States. It was approved in March 2013, under the brand name Invokana, and it was also marketed throughout the European Union under the same name.
- Dapagliflozin (brand name Forxiga) was approved by the EU in 2012, the first SGLT2 inhibitor approved anywhere. It was approved for use in the United States under the brand name Farxiga in January 2014.
- Empagliflozin, approved in the United States in August 2014, under the brand name Jardiance by Boehringer Ingelheim. Of the gliflozins, empagliflozin and tofogliflozin have the highest specificity for SGLT2 inhibition. This oral medicine for type 2 diabetes has been shown to reduce the risk of cardiovascular death.
- Enavogliflozin, developed by GC Pharma and Daewoong Pharmaceutical. Approved for clinical use in South Korea and Ecuador.
- Ertugliflozin was approved in the United States under the brand name Steglatro in December 2017.
- Henagliflozin, selective SGLT2 inhibitor. Approved in China in 2022.
- Ipragliflozin, produced by the Japanese company Astellas Pharma Inc. under the brand name Suglat, approved in Japan in January 2014.
- Luseogliflozin, developed by Taisho Pharmaceutical, was approved in Japan in March 2014, under the brand name Lusefi.
- Remogliflozin etabonate was commercially launched first in India by Glenmark in May 2019.
- Rongliflozin/Olorigliflozin has been evaluated in phase I trials, but is not yet approved by the FDA
- Sergliflozin etabonate discontinued after phase II trials.
- Sotagliflozin (Inpefa) is a dual SGLT1/SGLT2 inhibitor approved by the US Food and Drug Administration (FDA) in May 2023, to reduce the risk of cardiovascular death, hospitalization for heart failure, and urgent heart failure visit in adults with heart failure or type 2 diabetes, chronic kidney disease, and other cardiovascular risk factors.
- Tofogliflozin, developed by Sanofi and Kowa Pharmaceutical, was approved in Japan in March 2014, under the brand names Apleway and Deberza.
- Velagliflozin, marketed as Senvelgo, produced by Boehringer Ingelheim Animal Health, was approved for use in diabetic cats in 2023.

== Mechanism of action ==
Sodium glucose cotransporters (SGLTs) are proteins that occur primarily in the kidneys and play an important role in maintaining glucose balance in the blood. SGLT1 and SGLT2 are the two most known SGLTs of this family. SGLT2 is the major transport protein and promotes reabsorption from the glomerular filtration glucose back into circulation and is responsible for approximately 90% of the kidney's glucose reabsorption. SGLT2 is mainly expressed in the kidneys on the epithelial cells lining the first segment of the proximal convoluted tubule. By inhibiting SGLT2, gliflozins prevent the kidneys' reuptake of glucose from the glomerular filtrate and subsequently lower the glucose level in the blood and promote the excretion of glucose in the urine (glucosuria).

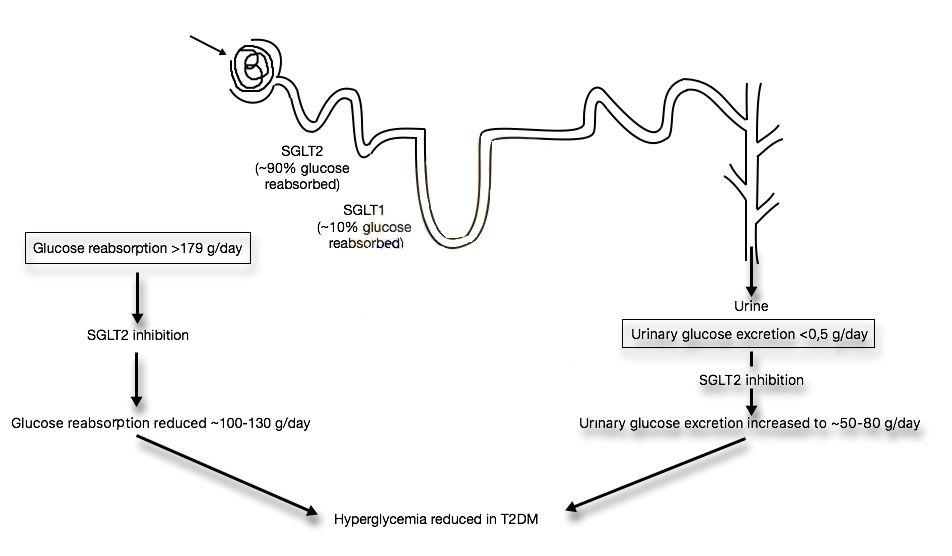
Reabsorption of glucose in the nephron

The mechanism of action on a cellular level is not well understood. However, it has been shown that binding of different sugars to the glucose site affects the orientation of the aglycone in the access vestibule. So when the aglycone binds, it affects the entire inhibitor. Together, these mechanisms lead to a synergistic interaction. Therefore, variations in the structure of both the sugar and the aglycone are crucial for the pharmacophore of SGLT inhibitors.

Dapagliflozin is an example of an SGLT-2 inhibitor; it is a competitive, highly selective inhibitor of SGLT. It acts via selective and potent inhibition of SGLT-2, and its activity is based on each patient's underlying blood sugar control and kidney function. The results are decreased kidney reabsorption of glucose, glucosuria effect increases with higher levels of glucose in the blood circulation. Therefore, dapagliflozin reduces the blood glucose concentration with a mechanism that is independent of insulin secretion and sensitivity, unlike many other antidiabetic medications. Functional pancreatic β-cells are not necessary for the activity of the medication, so it is convenient for patients with diminished β-cell function.

Sodium and glucose are co-transported by the SGLT-2 protein into the tubular epithelial cells across the brush-border membrane of the proximal convoluted tubule. This happens because of the sodium gradient between the tubule and the cell, and therefore provides a secondary active transport of glucose. Glucose is later reabsorbed by the passive transfer of endothelial cells into the interstitial glucose transporter protein.

TABLE 1: Where are SGLTs expressed?
SGLT	Expressed in human tissues
SGLT1	Intestine, trachea, kidney, heart, brain, testis, prostate
SGLT2	Kidney, brain, liver, thyroid, muscle, heart

Ratios of activity between SGLT1 and SGLT2 may be helpful in defining expression.

== Pharmacology ==
The elimination half-life, bioavailability, protein binding, the blood concentration Cmax at time tmax, and other pharmacokinetic parameters of various medications of this class are present in Table 2. These medications are excreted in the urine as inactive metabolites.

TABLE 2: PHARMACOKINETIC PARAMETERS OF VARIOUS SGLT-2 INHIBITORS
Name of drug	Bioavailability	Protein binding	tmax (hours)	t1/2 (hours)	Cmax	SGLT2 selectivity over SGLT1
Canagliflozin	65% (300 mg dose)	99%	1–2	10.6 (100 mg dose); 13.1 (300 mg dose)	1096 ng/mL (100 mg dose); 3480 ng/mL (300 mg dose)	250 fold
Dapagliflozin	78%	91%	1–1.5	12.9	79.6 ng/mL (5 mg dose); 165.0 ng/mL (10 mg dose)	1200 fold
Empagliflozin	90–97% (mice); 89% (dogs); 31% (rats)	86.20%	1.5	13.2 (10 mg dose); 13.3h (25 mg dose)	259nmol/L (10 mg dose); 687nmol/L (25 mg dose)	2500 fold
Ertugliflozin	70–90%	95%	0.5–1.5	11–17	268 ng/mL (15 mg dose)	2000 fold
Ipragliflozin (50 mg)	90%	96.30%	1	15–16 (50 mg dose)	975 ng/mL	360 fold
Luseogliflozin	35.3% (male rats); 58.2% (female rats); 92.7% (male dogs)	96.0–96.3%	0.625±0.354	9.24±0.928	119±27.0 ng/mL	1650 fold
Tofogliflozin (10 mg)	97.50%	83%	0.75	6.8	489 ng/mL	2900 fold

- C_{max}: Maximum serum concentration that the drug achieves in the body after the drug has been administered
- t_{max}: Time to achieve maximum plasma concentration
- t_{1/2}: Biological half-life

In studies that were made on healthy people and people with type 2 diabetes, who were given dapagliflozin in either single ascending dose (SAD) or multiple ascending dose (MAD) showed results that confirmed a pharmacokinetic profile of the medication. With dose-dependent concentrations the half-life is about 12–13 hours, Tmax 1–2 hours and it is protein-bound, so the medication has a rapid absorption and minimal excretion by the kidney.

Dapagliflozin disposition is not evidently affected by body mass index (BMI) or body weight, therefore, the pharmacokinetic findings are expected to be applicable to patients with a higher BMI. Dapagliflozin resulted in dose-dependent increases excretions in urinary glucose, up to 47g/d following single-dose administration, which can be expected from its mechanism of action.

Some studies found that dapagliflozin is associated with a decrease in body weight, which is statistically superior compared to placebo or other active comparators. It is primarily associated with caloric rather than fluid loss.

In contrast with other anti-hyperglycemic diabetes medications, SGLT2 inhibitors enhance, rather than suppress, gluconeogenesis and ketogenesis. Because SGLT2 inhibitors activate sirtuin 1 (and thus PGC-1α and FGF21), they are more cardioprotective than the other medications used to treat diabetes.

== Structure-activity relationship ==
The structure-activity relationship (SAR) of gliflozins is not fully understood.

The most commonly used gliflozins are dapagliflozin, empagliflozin, and canagliflozin. The differences in the structures are relatively small. The general structure includes a glucose sugar with an aromatic group in the β-position at the anomeric carbon. In addition to the glucose sugar moiety and the β-isomeric aryl substituent, the aryl group is composed of a diarylmethylene structure.

The synthesis of gliflozins involves three general steps. The first one is the construction of the aryl substituent, the next one is the introduction of the aryl moiety onto the sugar or glucosylation of the aryl substituent, and the last one is the deprotection and modification of the arylated anomeric center of the sugar.

Phlorizin was the first type of gliflozin, and it was non-selective against SGLT2/SGLT1. It is a natural O-aryl glycoside composed of a d-glucose and an aromatic ketone. However phlorizin is very unstable, it is rapidly degraded by glucosidases in the small intestines, so it can not be used as an orally administrered medication to treat diabetes. Structural modifications have been made to overcome this instability problem. The most efficient way was to conjugate the aryl moiety with the glucose moiety since C-glucosides are more stable in the small intestines than O-glucoside derivatives (C-C bond instead of C-O-C bond).

Phlorizin

In the sugar analogues of dapagliflozin, the β-C series are more active than α-C series so the β-configuration must be at C-1 for the inhibitory activity. Both dapagliflozin and empagliflozin contain a chlorine (Cl) atom in their chemical structure. Cl is a halogen and it has a high electronegativity. This electronegativity withdraws electrons from the bonds, and therefore it reduces the metabolism. The Cl atom also reduces the IC50 value of the medication, so the medication has better activity. The carbon-fluorine bond (C-F) also has a very low electron density.

Dapagliflozin

Empagliflozin

For example, in the chemical structure of canagliflozin, a fluorine atom is connected to an aromatic ring, making the compound more stable and reducing the metabolism of the compound. Empagliflozin contains a tetrahydrofuran ring but not canagliflozin nor dapagliflozin.

Canagliflozin

In the development of gliflozins, the distal ring contains a thiophene ring instead of an aromatic ring. However, the final chemical structures of the marketed gliflozins do not contain this thiophene ring.

== Research ==
SGLT2 inhibitors increase circulating ketone body concentrations. The cardioprotective effects of SGLT2 inhibitors have been attributed to the elevated ketone levels.

Gliflozins have been posited to exhibit protective effects on the heart, liver, kidneys, anti‐hyperlipidemic, anti‐atherosclerotic, anti‐obesity, anti‐neoplastic effects in in vitro, pre‐clinical, and clinical studies. Pleiotropic effects of this class have been attributed to a variety of its pharmacodynamic actions such as natriuresis, hemoconcentration, deactivation of renin–angiotensin–aldosterone system, ketone body formation, alterations in energy homeostasis, glycosuria, lipolysis, anti‐inflammatory, and antioxidative actions.

SGLT2 inhibitors have shown beneficial effects on liver function in clinical trials on individuals with metabolic dysfunction–associated steatotic liver disease (MASLD) and type 2 diabetes, and also on those without type 2 diabetes.

SGLT2 inhibitors also modified the adverse effects of ozone in heart failure, indicating a potential cardioprotective role.

SGLT2 inhibitors have anti-inflammatory and immunomodulatory effects through pathways such as NF-κB, AMPK/mTOR, and JAK/STAT.

== See also ==
- Fournier gangrene
