= Tofogliflozin =

Chemical compound

Tofogliflozin monohydrate

Clinical data
- Other names: CSG452
- ATC code: None

Legal status
- Legal status: Investigational

Identifiers
- IUPAC name: (1S,3'R,4'S,5'S,6'R)-6-(4-Ethylbenzyl)-6'-(hydroxymethyl)-3',4',5',6'-tetrahydro-3H-spiro[2-benzofuran-1,2'-pyran]-3',4',5'-triol hydrate (1:1)
- CAS Number: 1201913-82-7 903565-83-3 (anhydrous)
- PubChem CID: 46908928
- ChemSpider: 28527871
- UNII: P8DD8KX4O4
- KEGG: D09978
- ChEMBL: ChEMBL2105711
- CompTox Dashboard (EPA): DTXSID70152722

Chemical and physical data
- Formula: C_{22}H_{28}O_{7}
- Molar mass: 404.459 g·mol^{−1}
- 3D model (JSmol): Interactive image
- SMILES: CCc1ccc(cc1)Cc2ccc3c(c2)[C@]4([C@@H]([C@H]([C@@H]([C@H](O4)CO)O)O)O)OC3.O
- InChI: InChI=1S/C22H26O6.H2O/c1-2-13-3-5-14(6-4-13)9-15-7-8-16-12-27-22(17(16)10-15)21(26)20(25)19(24)18(11-23)28-22;/h3-8,10,18-21,23-26H,2,9,11-12H2,1H3;1H2/t18-,19-,20+,21-,22+;/m1./s1; Key:ZXOCGDDVNPDRIW-NHFZGCSJSA-N

Tofogliflozin (INN, USAN, codenamed CSG452) is a drug developed for the treatment of diabetes mellitus type 2 and was originally co-developed by Chugai Pharma in collaboration with Kowa and Sanofi. It is an inhibitor of subtype 2 sodium-glucose transport protein (SGLT2), which is responsible for at least 90% of the glucose reabsorption in the kidney. As of 2014, tofogliflozin was approved for use in Japan and is marketed under the brand names Apleway and Deberza. It has not been approved for use outside of Japan.

== See also ==
- Gliflozin
