= Spiroketals =

Heterocyclic Structure in Organic Chemistry

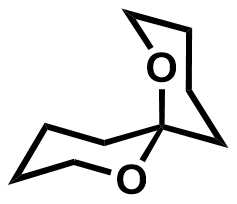
Chemical structure of the (S)-1,7-dioxaspiro[5.5]undecane

In chemistry, spiroketals are structural motifs composed of two heterocycles sharing one central carbon which makes them a subclass of spiro compound. Their structural specificity lays on the presence of one oxygen atom in each ring, in alpha of the spiro carbon. Although there are no rules about the size of each ring, the most widely encountered spiroketal are composed of five and six membered rings.

== Occurrence in nature ==
Many natural products of biological interest contain [6,5]- and [6,6]-spiroketal moieties that can adopt various configurations. The first example of a spiroketals in the literature appeared before 1970, such as the triterpenoid saponins and sapogenins. Then several works described the presence of spiroketals in various compounds. Like diarrheic shellfish poisoning (DSP) class of toxins containing in the okadaic acid and ancanthafolicin. The most noticeable occurring spiroketals are the whole range of fruit fly (Note: Flies of the Tephritidae and Drosophilidae families.) pheromones.

== Pharmacology interest ==
Avermectin substructure

Tofogliflozin structure

Due to its non-planar substructure, the spiroketal motif gain interest among the academical and industrial pharmaceutical research fields, both in structure-based drug design (SBDD) and development of screening libraries.

Avermectins have been found in fungus and are antiparasitic drugs. The avermectins appear to paralyze nematodes and arthropods by potentiating the presynaptic release of gamma-aminobutyric acid, thereby blocking post-synaptic transmission of nerve impulses.

Tofogliflozin is an inhibitor of human sodium glucose cotransporter 2 (hSGLT2) and was approved in 2014 in Japan for the treatment of Type 2 diabetes.

== Chemical synthesis ==
=== Acid catalyzed spiroketalisation ===
The most employed method to ring close spiroketal consists in the hydrolysis of the dihydroxyketal in acidic conditions, but this method is not granting stereocontrol. Thus, several miscellaneous methods have emerged in order to control the stereoselectivity of the spirocyclisation.

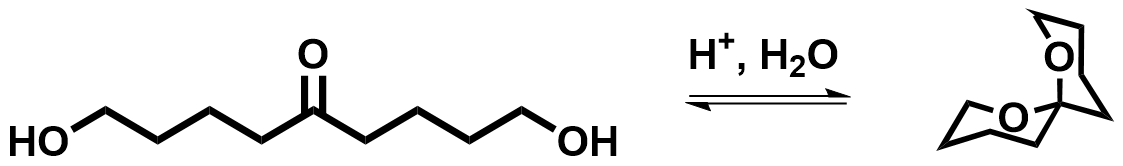
Acid catalyzed ring closure of spiroketal
