= C23H27ClO7 =

The molecular formula C_{23}H_{27}ClO_{7} (molar mass: 450.91 g/mol) may refer to:

- Empagliflozin
- Olorigliflozin
