= Licogliflozin =

Chemical compound

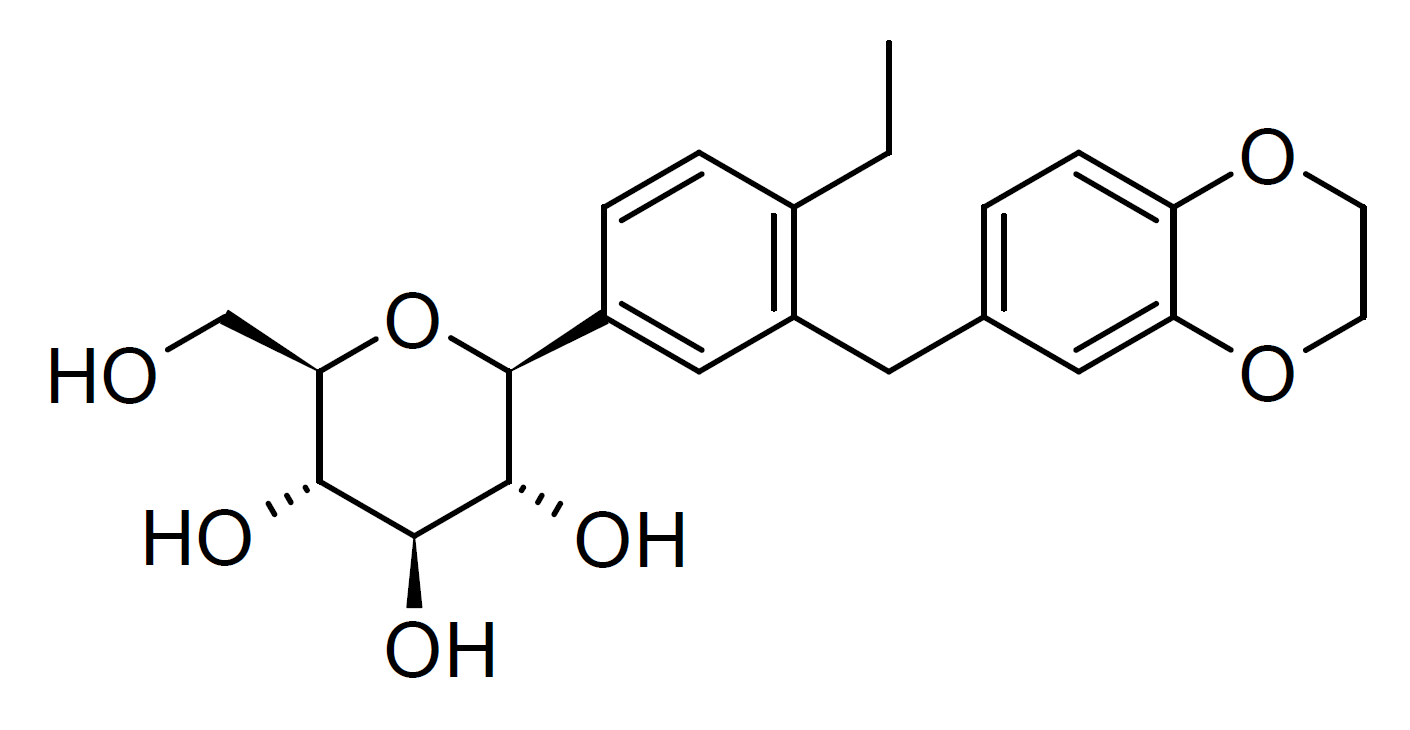

Legal status
- Legal status: Investigational

Identifiers
- IUPAC name: (2S,3R,4R,5S,6R)-2-{3-[(2,3-dihydro-1,4-benzodioxin-6-yl)methyl]-4-ethylphenyl}-6-(hydroxymethyl)oxane-3,4,5-triol
- CAS Number: 1291094-73-9
- PubChem CID: 52913524
- IUPHAR/BPS: 10654
- DrugBank: DB15048
- ChemSpider: 71045806
- UNII: 57J06X6EI0
- ChEMBL: ChEMBL4297625

Chemical and physical data
- Formula: C_{23}H_{28}O_{7}
- Molar mass: 416.470 g·mol^{−1}
- 3D model (JSmol): Interactive image
- SMILES: CCc1ccc([C@@H]2O[C@H](CO)[C@@H](O)[C@H](O)[C@H]2O)cc1Cc1ccc2c(c1)OCCO2
- InChI: InChI=1S/C23H28O7/c1-2-14-4-5-15(23-22(27)21(26)20(25)19(12-24)30-23)11-16(14)9-13-3-6-17-18(10-13)29-8-7-28-17/h3-6,10-11,19-27H,2,7-9,12H2,1H3/t19-,20-,21+,22-,23+/m1/s1; Key:XFJAMQQAAMJFGB-ZQGJOIPISA-N

Licogliflozin is a drug which acts as an SGLT2 inhibitor. It was originally developed as a potential treatment for obesity, but has also been investigated for other applications such as treating symptoms of polyendocrine metabolic ovarian syndrome (PMOS) and nonalcoholic steatohepatitis.
