= Henagliflozin =

Pharmaceutical drug

Clinical data
- Trade names: Rui Qin; 瑞沁
- Other names: SHR3824; SHR-3824

Legal status
- Legal status: Rx in China

Identifiers
- IUPAC name: (1R,2S,3S,4R,5R)-5-[4-Chloro-3-[(4-ethoxy-3-fluorophenyl)methyl]phenyl]-1-(hydroxymethyl)-6,8-dioxabicyclo[3.2.1]octane-2,3,4-triol
- CAS Number: 1623804-44-3
- PubChem CID: 56832738
- DrugBank: DB11939
- ChemSpider: 52083652
- UNII: 21P2M98388
- ChEMBL: ChEMBL4297431

Chemical and physical data
- Formula: C_{22}H_{24}ClFO_{7}
- Molar mass: 454.88 g·mol^{−1}
- 3D model (JSmol): Interactive image
- SMILES: CCOC1=C(C=C(C=C1)CC2=C(C=CC(=C2)[C@]34[C@@H]([C@H]([C@@H]([C@](O3)(CO4)CO)O)O)O)Cl)F
- InChI: InChI=1S/C22H24ClFO7/c1-2-29-17-6-3-12(8-16(17)24)7-13-9-14(4-5-15(13)23)22-20(28)18(26)19(27)21(10-25,31-22)11-30-22/h3-6,8-9,18-20,25-28H,2,7,10-11H2,1H3/t18-,19-,20+,21+,22+/m0/s1; Key:HYTPDMFFHVZBOR-VNXMGFANSA-N

Henagliflozin is a pharmaceutical drug for the treatment of type 2 diabetes. In China, it is approved for adult patients with type 2 diabetes to improve the glycemic control.

Henagliflozin, like other drugs of the gliflozin class, inhibits the transporter protein sodium/glucose cotransporter 2 (SGLT2) which leads to a reduction in blood glucose levels.

In a 26-week placebo-controlled trial of type 2 diabetics, telomere length significantly lengthened, the IGF-1 pathway was inhibited, and immune system function was improved in the henagliflozin group compared to the placebo group.
