= Hypersomatotropism (veterinary) =

- Other names: Acromegaly
- Specialty: Endocrinology
- Symptoms: Diabetes mellitus, acromegaly
- Types: Tumour, oestrous, progestogen
- Causes: Excessive growth hormone secretion
- Risk factors: Older intact bitches, older cats.
- Diagnostic method: Radiography, ultrasound, CT/MRI, Hormonal levels
- Differential diagnosis: Hyperadrenocorticism, hypothyroidism
- Treatment: Surgery, insulin therapy, radiotherapy, aglepristone

Hypersomatotropism, also known as acromegaly, is an endocrine disorder caused by excessive growth hormone production in cats and dogs.

== Description ==
Most cases of feline hypersomatotropism are caused by acidophilic pituitary tumours that predominantly secrete growth hormone. In some cases low levels of other pituitary hormones are secreted. Rarely a cat may have double adenomas. In a few cases the diagnosis has been pituitary acidophilic hyperplasia. In dogs nearly all cases of acromegaly are caused by endogenous or exogenous progestogens, this causes a hypersecretion of growth hormones from the mammary gland. Pituitary tumours causing excess growth hormone secretion are very rare in dogs.

== Signs and symptoms ==
Cats suffering from hypersomatotropism show a multitude of symptoms, the majority of these symptoms are not useful for identifying hypersomatotropism instead of just diabetes mellitus. The presence and level of severity of symptoms vary based on levels of growth hormone excess and duration of excess secretion. In dogs the manifestation of symptoms varies much more than with cats, some dogs may only show signs of acromegaly whilst others show mostly symptoms of diabetes mellitus. It is possible that this variability is related to breed. Diabetes, however, still occurs in a substantial number of dogs.

Most symptoms result from the diabetogenic effect of growth hormone and the acral enlargement effects of growth hormone and IGF-1. Neurological signs may be observed in some cats due to expansion of the tumour, this can occur in dogs with pituiary tumours too. The most common symptoms in cats are polyuria, polydipsia, and polyphagia due to diabetes mellitus; however, polyphagia can be the result of growth hormone excess itself. Other symptoms in both cats and dogs include ataxia, asthenia, hepatomegaly, visceromegaly, enlargement of head and distal extremities, heart murmur, degenerative atrophy, thickening of skin and fur, stridor and a plantigrade stance in cats. Disruption of the central nervous system occurs in 10–15% of cases, potential signs of this include: adipsia, lethargy, behavioural change, vision impairment, anorexia, temperature dysregulation, somnolence, stupor, and seizures. Less common but occasional symptoms include erythrocytosis, leukocytosis, and proteinuria.

The physical changes of hypersomatotropism are a result of anabolic effects of growth hormone and IGF-1; these have a gradual onset and progress slowly. The overgrowth of soft tissue and bone changes cause weight gain, broadening of the skull, prognathia inferior, and an enlarged tongue. Thickening of the oropharyngeal tissue may lead to respiratory distress and stridor. Degenerative anthropathy is caused by proliferation of chondrocytes and changes to the joint geometry.

Heart murmur occurs in most feline cases, further diagnostics may reveal cardiomegaly and other heart abnormalities. Congestive heart failure can occur during later stages of the disease.

A 1990 study reported 50% of cats diagnosed with hypersomatotropism had developed renal failure within 8–36 months of initial examination; however, another study from 2007 found a 12% incidence of azotaemia. Renal failure is a very common disease in elderly cats and it is controversial as to whether or not feline hypersomatotropism affects the development of renal failure.

In dogs the symptoms of diabetes mellitus commonly overshadows acromegalic symptoms.

=== Risk factors ===
There is no known breed predilection. Approximately 88% of described cats were male; male cats also have a predisposition to diabetes mellitus. Growth hormone secreting pituitary tumours in dogs have only been observed in male dogs of large breeds. Excessive growth hormone secretion caused by progestone use has been seen in a variety of breeds of varying size, as well as in mixed breed dogs, the same is true of growth hormone excess brought on by the oestrous cycle.

=== Co-morbidities ===
The vast majority of cats with hypersomatotropism also have diabetes mellitus.

=== Age of onset ===
Feline hypersomatotropism is usually diagnosed in elderly cats. The average age of diagnosis is between 10 and 11 years with a range of 4–17 years.

The age range of dogs reported with growth hormone secreting tumours is between 7 and 10 years. The age range of bitches with progestone induced hypersomatotropism is 4–11 years, for bitches with hypersomatotropism resulting from the estrous cycle the age range is between 6 and 13 years.

== History ==
In 1976, two cats were described with diabetes mellitus and acidophilic pituitary adenomas. Whilst growth hormone levels were not measured it was proposed that growth hormone excess from the tumours was the cause of the diabetes. In the following three decades further cases would only be written about infrequently and feline hypersomatotropism was considered a rare disease. This was challenged in 2007 after a study looking at the IGF-1 levels in cats with diabetes found a marked increase in 32% of cats.

Growth hormone excess induced by progestogens in dogs was first described in the 1970s and 1980s. In 1980 a crossbred Belgian Shepherd bitch with acromegaly that had been administered excessive amounts of medroxyprogesterone acetate (MPA); following cessation of MPA administration symptoms improved and hormone levels returned to normal. In 1981 it was reported that fifteen bitches receiving MPA injections to prevent oestrus. All fifteen showed signs of acromegaly and thirteen showed hyperglycaemia. Clinical signs were improved after cessation of MPA. Later studies would confirm an association between progestogen administration and acromegaly, glucose intolerance, and diabetes mellitus.

== Epidemiology ==
Studies have found the prevalence of heightened IGF-1 levels in cats with diabetes mellitus to range between 17.8% and 27.3%. According to Claudia Reusch, a professor at the University of Zurich, the prevalence of hypersomatotropism in diabetic cats is 10–15%, in cases that are hard to regulate it rises to 30% or higher.

== Cause ==
Growth hormone-producing acidophilic pituitary adenomas are the cause of hypersomatotropism in the vast majority of cats. Both dense and sparse granulated cells has been observed in the adenomas of cats with diabetes mellitus and elevated IGF-1 levels; however, it is not known whether this is because of different variants of the disease or not. It is also not known what percentage of tumours are mixed or plurihormonal tumours. This information has only been reported in studies with a small number of cases.

In dogs growth hormone is not just derived from the anterior pituitary gland, it also derives from the mammary gland. Mammary gland production of growth hormone is stimulated by progestogen, this occurs naturally in intact bitches. Synthetic progestogens can cause excessive growth hormone secretion and higher IGF-1 levels which may lead to acromegaly and diabetes mellitus. Progestogens are used to prevent oestrus in bitches and to treat certain hyperplasias. Growth hormone excess can occur in the luteal phase of the oestrous cycle in older bitches.

Somatotrophic adenomas have only been described in two dogs. In 1996 a 9-year-old male Doberman Pinscher with difficult to manage diabetes mellitus but no signs of acromegaly was euthanised. Necropsy later revealed an acidophilic adenoma with immunohistochemical staining for growth hormone, adrenocorticotropic hormone, and prolactin. In 2007 a 10-year-old male Dalmatian dog was described with acromegalic signs such as an enlarged tongue and head, widened interdental space, and thickening of skin; along with other signs of hypersomatotropism such as polyphagia, obesity, and stridor. Insulin levels were heightened and the dog had glucose intolerance; however, the dog was not diabetic as blood glucose levels were found to be normal after multiple tests. Levels of IGF-1 and growth hormone were heightened. CT imaging showed a pituitary mass which was later confirmed to be an acidophilic adenoma stained for growth hormone; however, mammary tumour-induced acromegaly is rare with few reported cases.

Hypothyroidism can increase levels of growth hormone and IGF-1 in dogs. Some of the physical changes in dogs with hypothyroidism may be due to increased growth hormone concentration.

== Pathophysiology ==
In cases of hypersomatotropism the growth hormone concentrations that circulate are chronically increased; however, the secretion of growth hormone remains the same. Growth hormone directly and indirectly affects the metabolic system; stimulation of IGF-1 synthesis is the indirect cause. Increased levels of growth hormone and IGF-1 result in proliferation of bone, cartilage, soft tissue, and increases the size of organs. These changes are responsible for the physical changes of hypersomatotropism that are characteristic to the condition.

Both growth hormone and IGF-1 can impact insulin in different manners. Chronic growth hormone excess has been linked to defects in hepatic and extrahepatic insulin actions. Growth hormone increases hepatic glucose production and decreases glucose uptake in extrahepatic tissue. Studies have suggested that growth hormone excess reduces insulin sensitivity. IGF-1 increases insulin sensitivity in both hepatic and extrahepatic tissue; however, in hypersomatotropism IGF-1 levels are unable to deal with the insulin resistance caused by excessive growth hormone levels.

In non-diabetic cases the insulin resistance is countered by increased insulin production from beta cells, which results in normoglycaemia (normal levels of blood sugar) being maintained. When beta cells fail to provide enough insulin production to compensate for the increased resistance diabetes mellitus develops. The cause for this failure is unknown. The vast majority of cats with hypersomatotropism also have diabetes mellitus.

In iatrogenic cases of hypersomatotropism, when the condition is caused by administered progestogens, the typical features of acromegaly occur; however, glucose tolerance is maintained initially by increased insulin levels, eventually insulin levels cannot be increased any further and glucose intolerance occurs. Most abnormalities are reversible after cessation of treatment; however, bone lesions may be permanent.

Increase in growth hormone and IGF-1 levels in bitches is a physiological event that occurs during the luteal phase of the oestrous cycle. In bitches with spontaneous acromegaly brought on by oestrous, their progesterone levels are normal; however, growth hormone levels are increased. Recovery following an ovariohysterectomy may be possible. The reason as to why some bitches develop acromegaly and diabetes mellitus during the oestrous cycle is unknown.

== Diagnosis ==
The vast majority of cats present with diabetes mellitus, the possibility of hypersomatotropism causing it is rarely considered until the diabetes becomes difficult to control. In cats with difficult to control diabetes mellitus, hypersomatotropism should be considered as a cause only after exclusion of other conditions that can impact insulin. Bitches with hypersomatotropism are usually presented 3–5 weeks after oestrus. It is not uncommon for owners to report symptoms relating to the diabetes mellitus as having occurred during the previous oestrous cycle, typically more mild and ending with anoestrus.

Most abnormalities on common tests, such as complete blood count, urinalysis, and biochemistry profile, are due to the diabetes mellitus. Some cats with hypersomatotropism have hyperproteinaemia. One study found it to be the only parameter more frequent in cats with hypersomatotropism than cats with just diabetes mellitus.

The common steps of diagnosis in cats involve presentation with diabetes mellitus, on examination either the acromegalic effects are noticed or they are not noticed and hypersomatotropism is not suspected until efforts to control the diabetes are proving difficult. Following this levels of growth hormone or IGF-1 are measured, if the results suggest hypersomatotropism it is then usually followed up with CT/MRI imaging to find the pituitary mass. In dogs the tentative diagnosis is made based on signs of acromegaly or diabetes mellitus alongside progestogen administration or dioestrus. A definitive diagnosis is made after based on growth hormone concentrations or increased IGF-1 levels. In male dogs with no history of progestogen administration the possibility of a pituitary tumour needs to be examined via CT/MRI.

In cats with difficult to manage diabetes but no other signs of hypersomatotropism, the potential for other causes of poor glycaemic control need to be considered.

=== Radiography ===
Radiographs of the abdomen commonly show hepatomegaly. Hepatomegaly is not exclusive to hypersomatotropism and is seen in diabetic cats without hypersomatotropism. Other possible findings are renomegaly and on rare occasions splenomegaly. Thoracic radiographs can reveal cardiomegaly, pulmonary oedema, and, if affected by congestive heart failure, pleural effusion. Radiographs of bones—including the skull and spine—may reveal: increase of soft tissue around the oropharynx, mandible enlargement, hyperostosis of the calvarium and nasal bone, degenerative arthropathy of the joints, and spondylosis deformans.

=== Ultrasound ===
Hepatomegaly is consistently identified with an abdominal ultrasound; however, it is also commonly found in diabetic cats without hypersomatotropism. Other findings from an abdominal ultrasound include: renomegaly, pelvic dilation, an enlarged pancreas, splenomegaly and bilateral adrenomegaly. The size of the adrenal glands can be useful in diagnosis, studies have found that the size of the adrenal gland in diabetic cats without hypersomatotropism does not differ significantly from non-diabetic cats; however, adrenomegaly is not pathognomonic to hypersomatotropism and can occur with other conditions in cats such as pituitary-dependent hypercortisolism.

=== Echocardiography ===
Findings of an echocardiography may include generalised or focal left ventricular hypertrophy, with or without left atrial dilation. Some cats show right heart disease with right-sided heart failure. However, echocardiography often reveals nothing.

=== CT and MRI scans ===
Imaging of the pituitary gland is important in confirming hypersomatotropism in cats where it is suspected. Showing a pituitary mass is important to establish a final diagnosis alongside clinical findings and hormonal findings. Knowing the size of the pituitary mass is also necessary to decide the best course of treatment. In the vast majority of cats with hypersomatropism, it is caused by an adenoma of the somatotrophic cells. Said adenoma is typically visible by the time a cat presents with symptoms; however, if pituitary imaging is performed during the early stages of the disease, it may still be small and difficult to recognise. Rarely CT/MRI imaging may not reveal anything, this may either due to a small size of the tumour or due to a different aetiology for the acromegaly. Rarely in humans with acromegaly, somatotrophic hyperplasia as the result of growth hormone releasing hormones, caused by a tumour. This aetiology has not been observed in cats; however, a cat with normal CT and MRI imaging, the histopathology showed—instead of adenoma—acidophilic proliferation.

=== Hormonal evaluation ===
Similar to humans, a diagnosis of hypersomatotropism in cats and dogs requires demonstration of growth hormone excess or heightened IGF-1 concentrations. Growth hormone levels can be measured with a radioimmunoassay. However the cost may impact availability of this.

All cats with hypersomatotropism that have been tested in studies displayed increased growth hormone levels. Some cats had significantly increased levels; in other cats, the increase was only slightly above normal levels. Cats in those studies were likely in the later stages of the disease. A single instance of elevated growth hormone levels is not indicative of hypersomatotropism, it can be the result of a secretory pulse and mildly increased growth hormone levels have been observed in diabetic cats without hypersomatotropism. The recommended practice is for several tests with 10 minute intervals.

IGF-1 levels can be detected with a blood test. The vast majority of cats with hypersomatotropism have increased IGF-1 levels, most dogs with hypersomatotropism have increased IGF-1 levels. Normal levels of IGF-1 have been seen in a few cats, potentially due to these cats being at the early stages of the disease. Other causes need to be investigated in cats with normal IGF-1 levels and suspected hypersomatotropism. IGF-1 levels may be lower due to lymphoma or other diseases. IGF-1 levels can be normal in cats with hypersomatotropism when the measurement is taken prior to insulin therapy. IGF-1 levels are significantly lower in cats with untreated diabetes mellitus without hypersomatotropism. To counteract this, diabetic cats with suspected hypersomatotropism can be treated for 6–8 weeks with insulin before testing. Another issue with IGF-1 testing is that most tests consider values of other 1000 ng/mL to be indicative of hypersomatotropism, even though healthy cats and cats with diabetes mellitus but not hypersomatotropism have levels below 800 ng/mL, leaving a grey zone of 800–1000 ng/mL. A study in 2000 reported eight cats with diabetes mellitus without hypersomatotropism had levels of IGF-1 above the normal range. Other studies suggested that this result was due to long term insulin therapy. Technical issues with the testing may result in false reports of increased levels due to the tests removing the proteins that circulating IGF-1 binds to. Multiple cats with IGF-1 levels reported above 1000 ng/mL did not show signs of hypersomatotropism during further examination.

=== Differential diagnosis ===
Hyperadrenocorticism is a potential differential diagnosis for poor glycaemic control. Hyperadrenocorticism is associated with insulin resistance and is often caused by a pituitary tumour; however, clinical signs differ between the two conditions. Hyperadrenocorticism may cause weight loss, leading to cachexia and alopecia and other dermatological conditions. These symptoms do not show in hypersomatotropism. Diagnostic imaging results for the conditions are often the same, such as hepatomegaly, adrenomegaly, and pituitary mass. Measuring growth hormone and IGF-1 levels can differentiate the diseases when physical symptoms are unremarkable.

Dogs with primary hypothyroidism also have increased levels of growth hormone and IGF-1; however, thyroxine and thyroid stimulating hormone levels are normal in dogs with hypersomatotropism.

Progestogens administered to dogs may result in endogenous adrenocorticotropic hormone secretion being suppressed, which lowers the cortisol concentration.

== Treatment ==
Treating hypersomatotropism involves treating both the hypersomatotropism and the diabetes mellitus. Sometimes treatment is limited to the diabetes due to owners not wishing to treat the hypersomatotrism due to the associated costs. Monitoring of blood glucose levels is imperative as if improvement or resolution of insulin resistance is not identified hypoglycaemia can occur, leading to death. In dogs with progestogen induced hypersomatotropism the administration of progestogens should cease immediately. For cases derived from a mammary tumour it should be surgically removed.

=== Insulin ===
Insulin resistance can vary greatly between cats. In some cases glycaemic control can be achieved with doses of 1 to 3 U/cat b.i.d., a 'normal' level of insulin dosage. Insulin levels should be increased by 0.5 to 1 U/cat b.i.d. every 5 to 7 days until glycaemic control has been achieved (blood glucose level of 100 to 300 mg/dL). Frequent monitoring of cats and dogs undergoing insulin therapy is required. Levels should not be increased higher than 15 U/cat b.i.d. for cats. In dogs insulin therapy should be initiated immediately if the blood glucose concentration is higher than >140 mg/dL or 8 mmol/L. Severity of hyperglycaemia determines the level provided, with the range for dogs being between 0.05 and 0.25 U/kg b.i.d.

=== Pituitary surgery ===
Transsphenoidal cryohypophysectomy is a difficult procedure that is only offered at specialised clinics. Few case reports of pituitary surgery in cats with hypersomatotropism have been published. In one case the procedure resulted in a 95% decrease to insulin requirement following the surgery and diabetic remission 3 weeks later. A follow up 18 months later showed normal growth hormone and IGF-1 levels. In another case there was a decreased insulin requirement, well-managed diabetes mellitus, and no acromegalic signs during an 18-month period of observation following the surgery. These cases and others with similar results showcase that beta cells have a potential to recover in hypersomatotropic cats with appropriate treatment.

=== Radiation therapy ===
Radiation therapy is the most frequently used treatment for hypersomatotropic cats. Radiation therapy is expensive, limited in availability, cost, frequent anaesthetic, and the unpredictable outcomes for hormonal control. The resolution or improvement of neurological signs is the most consistent effect. Improvement diabetes symptoms is less consistent. One study found an average of 5 weeks for improvement to glycaemic control with all cats seeing an improvement within 20 weeks. The same study found 6 of the 14 cats to achieve diabetic remission within 6 months with an average of 3.6 months. Diabetic remission may occur as late as a year after radiotherapy. Improvement of diabetic symptoms occurs in roughly 70-80% of cases, diabetic remission occurs in roughly 50%. The physical acromegalic changes often persistent or have only slight improvement. High IGF-1 levels have been reported in cats following radiation therapy. Of note is that in several of those cases the patient had good control of diabetic symptoms or was in remission. Radiation therapy is tolerated by the majority of cats. Side effects such as ischaemic brain necrosis and hearing loss are rare and proper fractionation protocol can prevent these effects from occurring; hypopituitarism has not been reported in cats, despite being a common adverse effect in humans. Survival times for cats after radiation therapy has been reported to be up to 5 years.

=== Ovariohysterectomy ===
Ovariohysterectomy should be performed in bitches with oestrous associated hypersomatotoprism as soon as it can be performed. Following the procedure growth hormone and IGF-1 levels will quickly return to normal values. If the procedure cannot be immediately performed aglepristone should be administered subcutaneously every 24 hours at a rate of 10 mg/kg. Diabetic remission may occur within 1 to 8 weeks following the surgery.

=== Aglepristone ===
In cases resulting from progestogen administration aglepristone should be administered subcutaneously twice at a 24-hour interval at a rate of 10 mg/kg for all dogs with severe acromegaly or are diabetic.

== Histopathology ==
The most common finding of a histopathology is an acidophil adenoma of the pituitary gland, this occurs in most cases. In rare occasions no tumour will be found, however, a proliferation of acidophilic cells will be discovered. Other findings may include adenomatous hyperplasia of the thyroid and parathyroid glands, multinodular hyperplasia of the adrenal cortices, multifocal or disseminated nodular hyperplasia of the pancreas with ductal fibrosis, lymphocytic-plasmacytic infiltration, hyalinisation of the islets, and amyloid deposition.

== Prognosis ==
Untreated hypersomatotropism has a guarded to poor prognosis. In most cases the insulin resistance and other symptoms get progressively worse causing insulin treatment to become difficult. Euthanasia often occurs a few months after diagnosis in cats due to owner's being unable or unwilling to deal with treatment. Other reasons for euthanasia include congestive heart failure, renal failure, respiratory distress, and neurological symptoms. Cats that have been treated with radiotherapy or pituitary surgery may have a good prognosis; survival has been observed for several years. In progestogen induced hypersomatotropism the prognosis is usually good after cessation of progestogen administration. In dogs soft tissue changes are usually resolved in a few weeks or months, persistent bone changes usually do not cause clinical problems. For diabetes mellitus the prognosis for the condition depends on the beta cell damage.
