= Cushing's syndrome (veterinary) =

Cushing's syndrome disease
- Other names: hyperadrenocorticism, spontaneous hypercortisolism
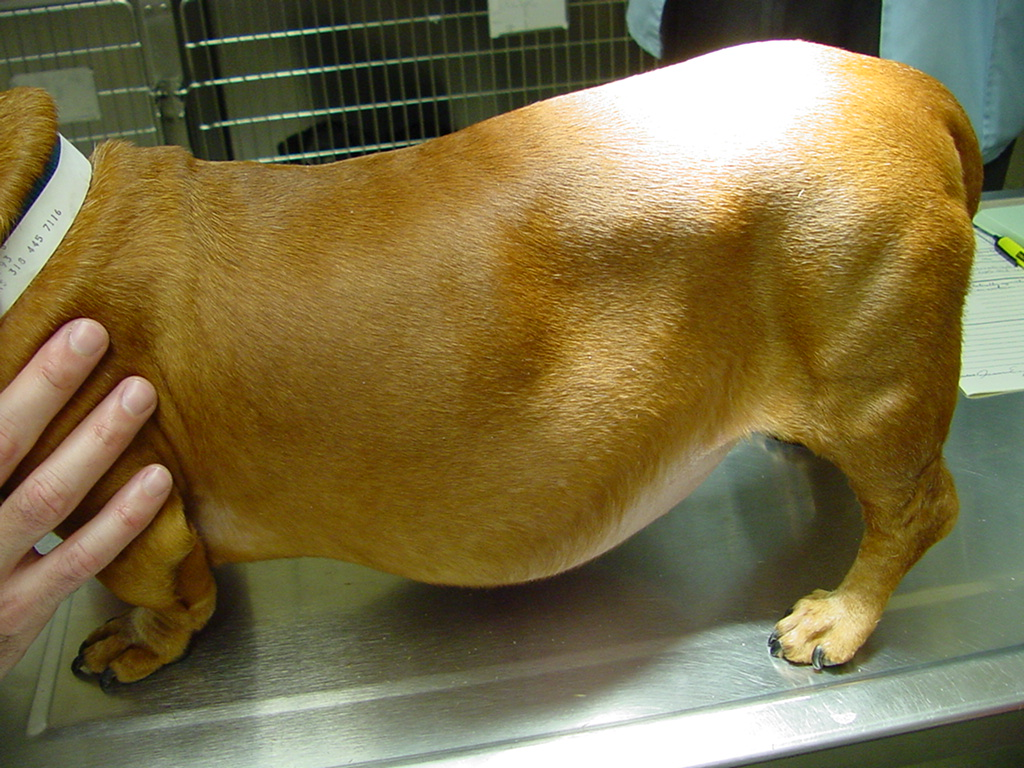
- Dachshund with Cushing's syndrome.
- Specialty: Endocrinology
- Symptoms: Enlarged stomach, lethargy, diabetes mellitus (cats)
- Types: Pituitary dependent, adrenal dependent, iatrogenic
- Risk factors: Certain breeds, bitches
- Medication: Lysodren, trilostane, L-Deprenyl
- Frequency: 0.2% to 0.28% of dogs.
- Named after: Harvey Cushing

Cushing's syndrome disease, also known as hyperadrenocorticism and spontaneous hypercortisolism, is a condition resulting from an endocrine disorder where too much adrenocorticotropic and cortisol hormones are produced, causing toxicity. It may arise in animals as well as in humans. Cushing's is an umbrella term for conditions caused by elevated cortisol and adrenocorticotropic hormone levels.

Cushing's disease most commonly refers to pituitary-dependent hyperadrenocorticism, the most common condition of Cushing's syndrome, but 'Cushing's' is used to refer to all hyperadrenocorticism conditions.

Cats are less likely to be diagnosed than dogs. Cushing's occurs infrequently in hamsters. It may be more common but due to hamsters not being routinely treated it may go undiagnosed.

== Classification ==
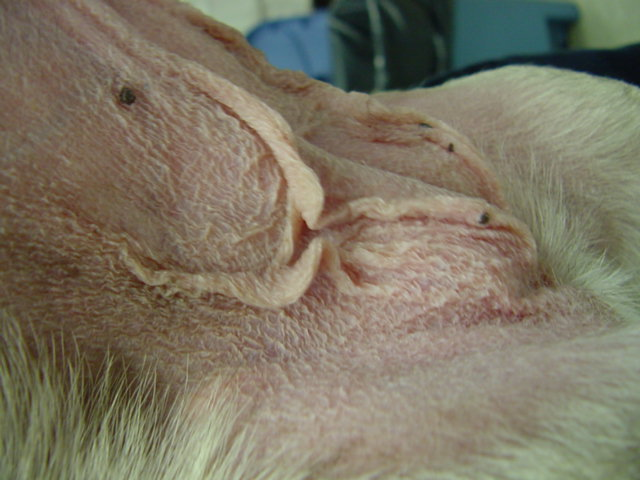
Cutaneous atrophy in a dog with Cushing's

Cushing's syndrome is classified as either pituitary-dependent, adrenal-dependent, or iatrogenic. Pituitary-dependent Cushing's is caused by an adrenocorticotropic hormone producing pituitary tumour. Adrenal-dependent Cushing's is caused by an adrenal tumour. Pituitary-dependent Cushing's accounts for 80-85% of cases. Other forms have been described but they appear to be rare. Ectopic adrenocorticotropic hormone secretion has been described in a German Shepherd dog, those reviewing the case noted it could be the result of an abdominal neuroendocrine tumour. In one case a Vizsla was diagnosed with food-dependent hypercortisolemia.

== Description ==
Cortisol is a hormone produced in the adrenal glands. Cortisol is stored in these glands and released to help prepare the body for a fight-or-flight response. Cortisol makes the body mobilise fat and sugar stores and retain sodium and water by adjusting the metabolism. This allows the body to easily access stored resources. When the body is constantly exposed to this hormone the effects it results in Cushing's syndrome. Blood levels of cortisol determine whether additional cortisol production is required via a negative feedback loop. An improper feedback loop due to a tumour or as a side effect of medication can result in an overproduction of adrenocorticotropic and cortisol hormones. Animals can only handle limited periods of elevated cortisol levels.

== Signs and symptoms ==
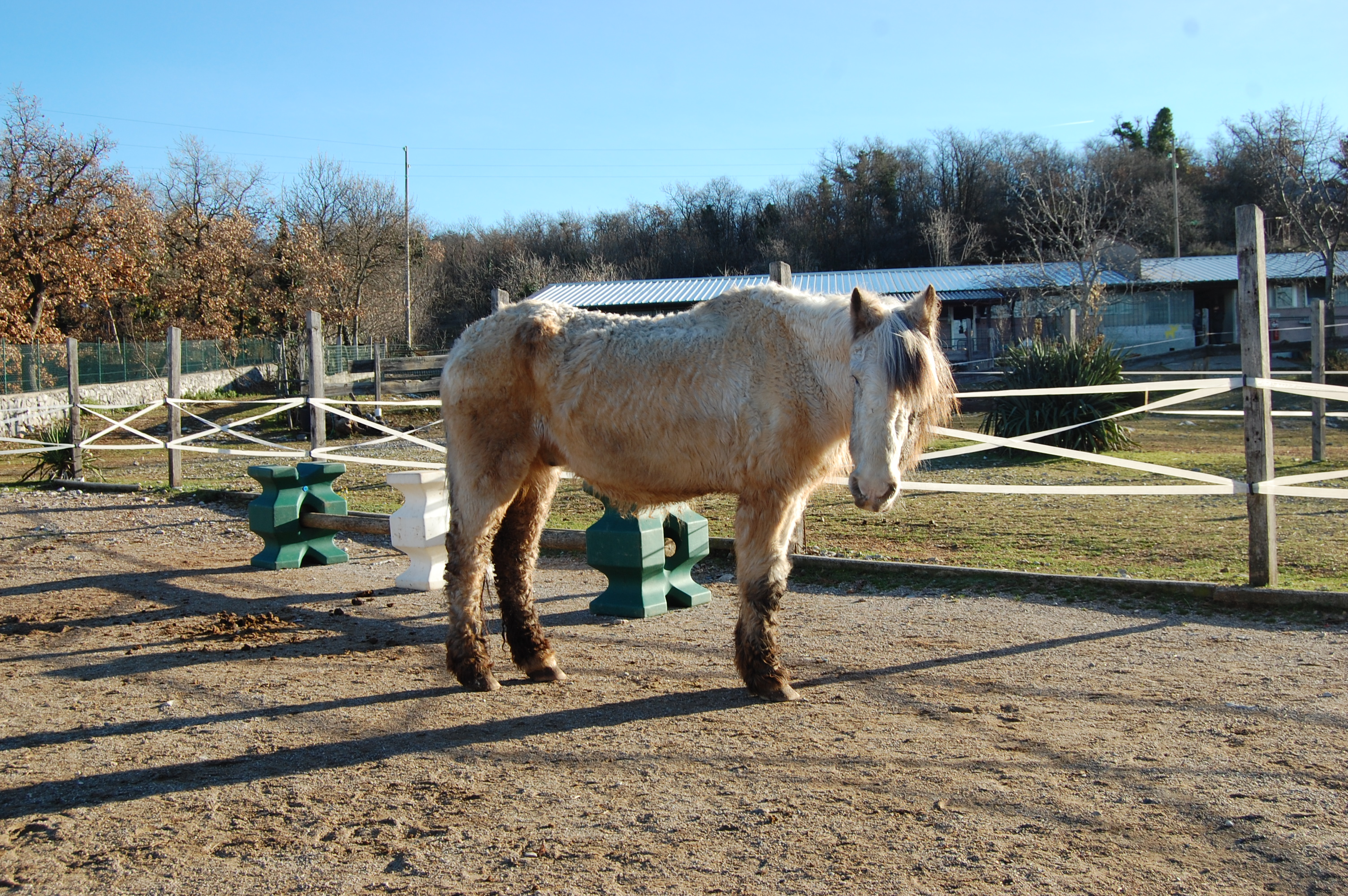
A horse with Cushing's

Cushing's has a wide variety of symptoms and most gradually appear with a slow onset. The reason for the wide variety is due to how cortisol affects many different systems of the body.

Symptoms in dogs include:

- Urinary incontinence
- Polydipsia
- Polyphagia
- An enlarged stomach or 'potbelly'
- Lethargy
- Skin disease
- Muscle wasting

Dermatological symptoms include:

- Haematoma
- Alopecia
- Chronic skin infections
- Self-mutilation
- Seborrhoea
- Pyoderma
- Calcinosis cutis
- Hyperpigmentation
- Comedones

Rare clinical signs of Cushings include:

- Thromboembolism
- Congestive heart failure
- Bronchial calcification
- Blindness
- Polyneuropathies
- Enlarged prostate
- Testicular atrophy
- Retarded muscle relaxation
- Behavioural changes (if the tumour is large enough)

A potbelly appearance is present in 90% of dogs with Cushing's, the cause is a hormonal redistribution of body fat and the breakdown of abdominal muscles. This breakdown of muscle protein leads to muscle weakness and lethargy.

Other potential complications from Cushing's in dogs include proteinuria, glomerulosclerosis, pancreatitis, and gallbladder mucocele. A study of 66 dogs with Cushing's found 91% of dogs to have either polyuria or polydipsia, 79% to have polyphagia, and 77% to have alopecia.

Signs of ectopic adrenocorticotropic hormone secretion that accompany the rapidly progressing physical changes are high plasma levels of adrenocorticotropic hormones and cortisol alongside hypokalaemia.

The symptoms of Cushing's in cats is similar to that of dogs. For cats the most common reason for referral resulting in a diagnosis is diabetes mellitus. Abnormal dermatological findings were the most common reason for referral after physical examination in cats. 80% of cats with Cushing's develop diabetes mellitus compared to 10% of dogs. One study of cats found all 30 to have dermatological lesions, 87% to have polyuria or polydipsia, and 70% to have polyphagia. Curling of the tips of the ears may occur.

Signs in hamsters include nonpruritic alopecia which will slowly progress to complete hair loss except for vibrissae, hyperpigmentation, polyuria, polydipsia, and polyphagia.

=== Co-morbidities ===
Animals with Cushing's syndrome often have a co-morbidity such as: diabetes mellitus, chronic urinary tract infections, systemic hypertension, and pulmonary thromboembolism. The prevalence of systemic hypertension in dogs with Cushing's ranges between 31%-86%; however the reasons for this are unknown but hypotheses include: increased mineralocorticoid activity, decreased concentrations of nitric oxide, and increased renal vascular resistance. Studies have not found a difference in prevalence nor severity of systemic hypertension in dogs with pituitary-dependent versus adrenal-dependent Cushing's. No correlation has been identified with systolic blood pressure, age, sex, and neuter status. A relationship between systolic blood pressure and urinary protein to creatinine ratio or base cortisol levels has been inconsistently identified in studies.

== Causes ==
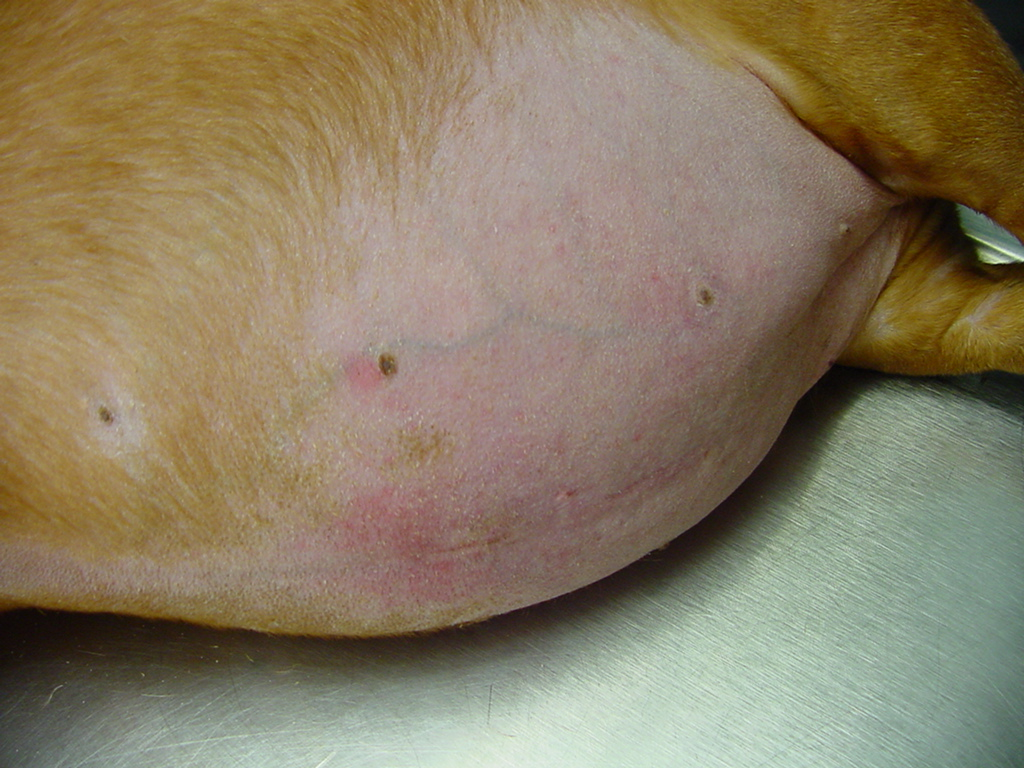
Abdominal distension and cutaneous atrophy in a dachshund with Cushing's syndrome

Pituitary-dependent Cushing's is caused by production of too much adrenocorticotropic hormone by a functioning pituitary tumour. The tumour may be benign or malignant. Adrendal-dependent Cushing's is caused by a primary adrenal disorder.

Iatrogenic Cushing's is caused by long term use of corticosteroid-type medicine which can produce the same effects as cortisol produced by the body.

=== Risk factors ===
Older dogs are more likely to present with Cushing's syndromes. Greater prevalence has been observed in some breeds such as the Yorkshire Terrier, Poodle (miniature), Miniature Dachshund, Boxer, Irish Setter, and Basset Hound. One study found bitches to be 1.4 times more likely to be diagnosed than dogs.

== Diagnosis ==
The presentation of clinical signs occurs with great variation due to the gradual onset of Cushing's. In cases where a tumour is the cause it may take months or years for a diagnosis to occur. A study looking at 66 records of dogs with Cushing's found the duration of clinical signs before diagnosis to be between 1 and 36 months with a median of 8 months.

Routine diagnostic testing for Cushing's includes: a complete blood count, urinalysis, and a serum biochemistry panel; however the abnormalities these tests detect are not specific to Cushing's. Abnormalities that can be found in a complete blood count include: thrombocytosis, neutrophilia, lymphopenia, erythrocytosis, eosinopenia, and monocytosis. Abnormalities that can be found via serum biochemistry include: hyperglycaemia, hypercholesterolaemia, hypokalaemia, increased alkaline phosphatase concentration, alanine aminotransferase levels, creatinine concentration, lipase activity, and decreased urea concentration.

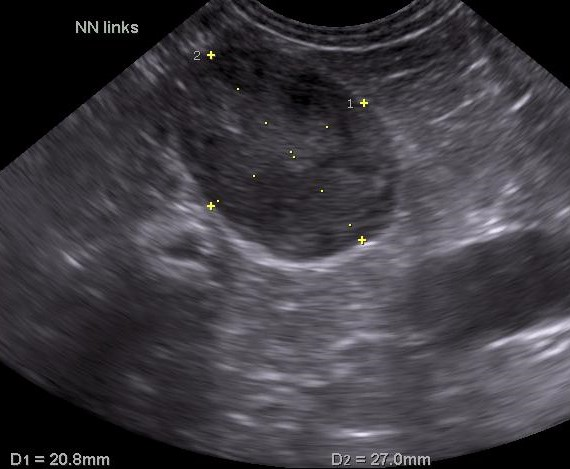
Sonographic image of the left adrenal gland in a dog with adrenal hyperadrenocorticism

Ultrasonography, CT scans, and MRI are used to identify any abnormality in the pituitary or adrenal gland. This helps diagnose if the patient has pituitary-dependent Cushing's or adrenal-dependent Cushing's.

Cushing's may cause a breakdown of dermal proteins, causing shiny and thin skin, this can lead to secondary infection and is pathognomonic of Cushing's.

=== Hamsters ===
Blood tests are not always practical for hamsters due to their small size; abdominal ultrasounds can be used to show adrenal gland enlargement.

=== Differential diagnosis ===
Hypothyroidism is a potential differential diagnosis. Glucocorticoids lower the serum concentration of thyroxine and triiodothyronine. 40-50% of dogs with Cushing's have lowered levels of these thyroid hormones. The cause of this is not known. When a dog has lowered serum levels of thyroid hormones and endocrine alopecia it is harder to differentiate between hypothyroidism and Cushing's. Signs of polydipsia, polyuria, and polyphagia help to differentiate as these symptoms do not occur in hypothyroidism. If Cushing's is suspected it can be confirmed via urinalysis of the creatine/cortisol ratio. L-thyroxine is the most common method of treating hypothyroidism in dogs, if used to treat a dog with Cushing's the dog will likely display polyuria and polydipsia and the condition may worsen.

== Prognosis ==
Prognosis varies based on the type of Cushing's, if the tumour is benign or malignant, and treatment method. Median survival times for dogs of 662-900 days have been observed in pituitary-dependent cases treated with trilostane, and 353-475 days for adrenal-dependent cases treated with trilostane. Survival rates of 72-79% have been observed in dogs with pituitary-dependent Cushing's four years after a hypophysectomy. Dogs affected by adrenal-dependent Cushing's that underwent an adrenalectomy had a median survival rate of 533-953 days.

== Treatment ==
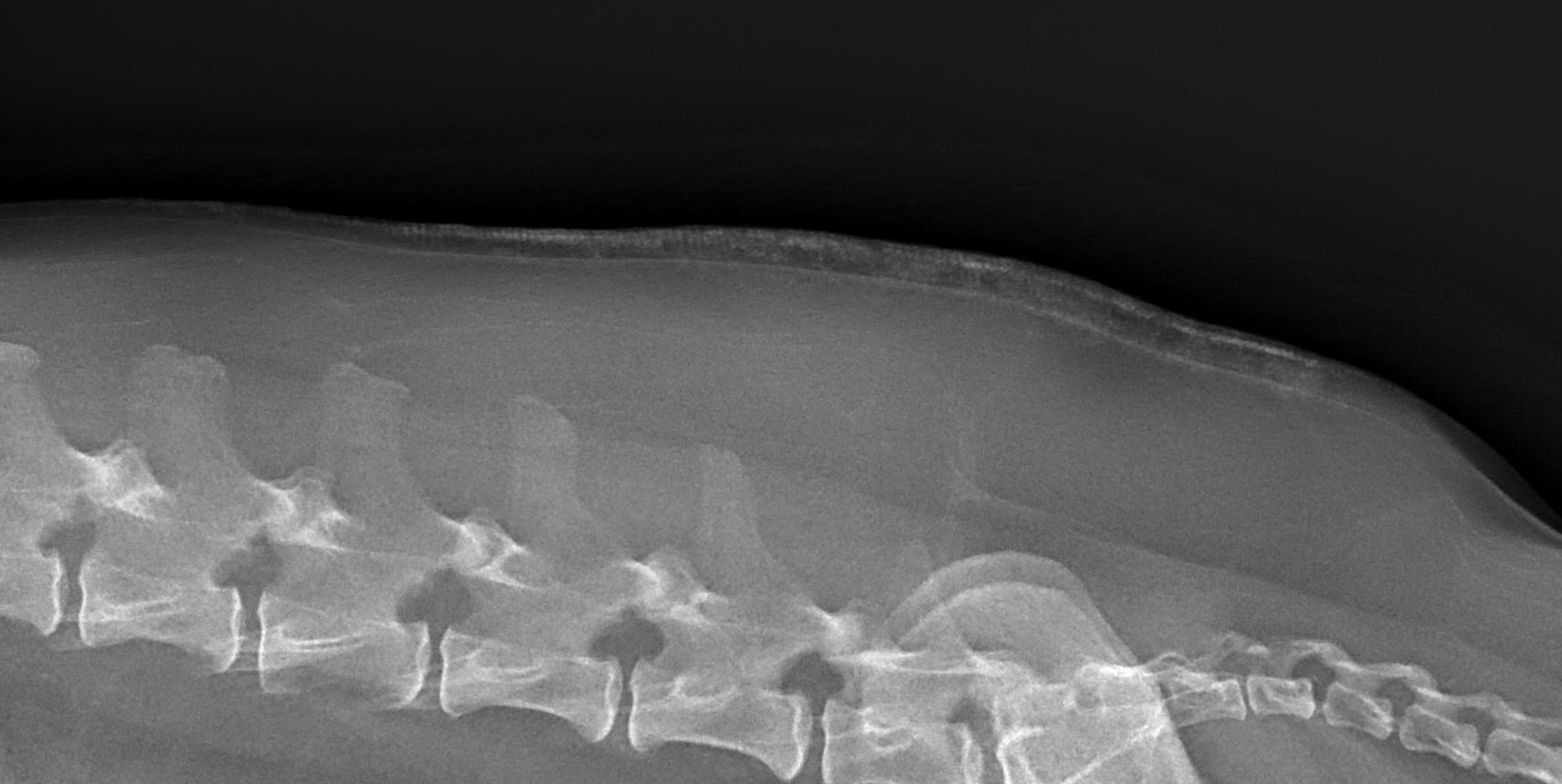
X-Ray image of a calcinosis cutis in a dog with pituitary dependent hyperadrenocorticism

Treatment of Cushing's depends on the cause. It is possible to cure Cushing's if the tumour is small, benign, and located on the adrenal gland; however, this is not common. Hypophysectomy is an option for patients with good clinical signs and a high life expectancy. Inoperable pituitary tumours may be treated with radiation, this is therapeutic as can take up to 16 months for change to show.

=== Mitotane ===
Mitotane, sold under the brand name Lysodren, erodes the layers of the adrenal gland which produce corticosteroid hormones. Whilst the pituitary tumour will still excrete excessive hormones, the adrenal gland will no longer be capable of excess production of hormones. Mitotane was historically the only treatment used for pituitary dependent Cushing's in dogs and is relatively cheap. Disadvantages of mitotane as a treatment include the side effects and the requirement for blood test monitoring. Issues can arise when too much of the adrenal cortex becomes eroded. Approximately 30% of dogs will experience a reaction in response to treatment with mitotane; prednisone may be used as an antidote. In the event of a reaction, mitotane treatment is discontinued until regrowth of the adrenal gland occurs. Occasionally the erosion is permanent and the dog will require treatment for cortisone deficiency. The risk of permanent or life-threatening reactions are between 2-5% based on two studies. Side effects of mitotane include diarrhoea, vomiting, anorexia, adipsia, and lethargy.

=== Trilostane ===
Trilostane, sold under the brand name Vetoryl, inhibits the 3-beta-hydroxysteroid dehydrogenase enzyme. The enzyme is responsible for the production of cortisol and the inhibition of it will inhibit cortisol production. Trilostane has been identified by multiple studies as an effective treatment for Cushing's. Common side effects of trilostane include lethargy and anorexia. Addisonian reactions where the adrenal cortex dies have been reported, but the reasons for this reaction are not known. Most reactions can be reversed with the ceasing of treatment; however permanent reactions are possible. Permanent reactions from using trilostane are idiosyncratic, whereas permanent erosion caused by mitotane is dose-dependent. Therefore, blood testing monitoring is required. The risk of permanent or life-threatening reactions are between 2-3% based on two studies.

=== L-Deprenyl ===
L-Deprenyl, sold under the brand name anipryl, does not target cortisol production, instead it directly addresses the tumour. Research on L-Deprenyl has shown that adrenocorticotropic hormone secretion in the intermediate area of the pituitary gland is controlled by the neurotransmitter dopamine. High levels of dopamine production will shut down adrenocorticotropic hormone secretion. L-Deprenyl inhibits the enzymes responsible for the degradation of dopamine as well as stimulating the production of dopamine. Approximately 5% of dogs experience minor nausea, restlessness, and reduced hearing ability. The different mechanism of L-Deprenyl and that it breaks down into amphetamine and methamphetamine—which suppresses hunger— meaning the normal monitoring tests are not useful in dogs treated with L-Deprenyl. Independent studies showed roughly 20% of dogs to improve with L-Deprenyl compared to 80% with studies sponsored by the manufacturer. Advantages of L-Deprenyl include the lower risk of side effects and inability to cause hypoadrenocoritism. Disadvantages are the substantial cost and the comparatively longer time before improvements can be noticed compared to lysodren. Some veterinarians may use high doses of lysodren to induce hypoadrenocorticism (a deficiency of cortisone), as it is easier to treat. This is not a common method and is not used in some hospitals.

== Epidemiology ==
The prevalence of hyperadrenocorticism in dogs is between 0.2% and 0.28%.

An English study comparing dogs with hyperadrenocorticism to general hospital cases found smaller breeds, overweight dogs, dogs over the age of 9, and neutered dogs to be more likely to be diagnosed.

== See also ==
- Pituitary pars intermedia dysfunction, also known as equine Cushing's disease.
- Hypoadrenocorticism in dogs, a condition characterised by a lack of cortisol hormones.
