= Luseogliflozin =

Chemical compound

Clinical data
- Trade names: Lusefi
- Other names: TS-071
- ATC code: A10BK07 (WHO)

Legal status
- Legal status: Rx-only in Japan

Identifiers
- IUPAC name: (2S,3R,4R,5S,6R)-2-{5-[(4-ethoxyphenyl)methyl]-2-methoxy-4-methylphenyl}-6-(hydroxymethyl)thiane-3,4,5-triol
- CAS Number: 898537-18-3
- PubChem CID: 11988953
- DrugBank: DB12214
- ChemSpider: 10161420
- UNII: C596HWF74Z
- ChEBI: CHEBI:134725
- ChEMBL: ChEMBL1093423
- CompTox Dashboard (EPA): DTXSID10237921

Chemical and physical data
- Formula: C_{23}H_{30}O_{6}S
- Molar mass: 434.55 g·mol^{−1}
- 3D model (JSmol): Interactive image
- SMILES: CCOc1ccc(Cc2cc([C@@H]3S[C@H](CO)[C@@H](O)[C@H](O)[C@H]3O)c(OC)cc2C)cc1
- InChI: InChI=1S/C23H30O6S/c1-4-29-16-7-5-14(6-8-16)10-15-11-17(18(28-3)9-13(15)2)23-22(27)21(26)20(25)19(12-24)30-23/h5-9,11,19-27H,4,10,12H2,1-3H3/t19-,20-,21+,22-,23+/m1/s1; Key:WHSOLWOTCHFFBK-ZQGJOIPISA-N

Luseogliflozin (trade name Lusefi) is a pharmaceutical drug (an SGLT2 inhibitor) used for the treatment of type 2 diabetes mellitus. It was approved for use in Japan in 2014. In a meta-analysis involving data from 10 randomized controlled trials (1304 patients), Dutta et al. demonstrated the good glycaemic efficacy (mean glycated hemoglobin reduction of -0.76% and mean fasting glucose reduction of -26.69mg/dl) and safety of luseogliflozin 2.5mg/day as compared to placebo. Additional benefits include significant reduction in systolic blood pressure (-4.19 mm Hg), serum triglycerides (-12.60mg/dl), uric acid (-0.48mg/dl) and alanine aminotransferase (-4.11 IU/L) as compared to placebo, highlighting the beneficial impact on the different aspects of metabolic syndrome.
