= Velagliflozin =

Medication

Clinical data
- Trade names: Senvelgo
- License data: US DailyMed: Velagliflozin
- Routes of administration: By mouth
- ATCvet code: QA10BK90 (WHO)

Legal status
- Legal status: CA: ℞-only; US: ℞-only; EU: Rx-only

Identifiers
- IUPAC name: 2-[(4-cyclopropylphenyl)methyl]-4-[(2S,3R,4R,5S,6R)-3,4,5-trihydroxy-6-(hydroxymethyl)oxan-2-yl]benzonitrile
- CAS Number: 946525-65-1
- PubChem CID: 24862817
- ChemSpider: 58827717
- UNII: FV2YU8SL0P; EQE2P2T77I

Chemical and physical data
- Formula: C_{23}H_{25}NO_{5}
- Molar mass: 395.455 g·mol^{−1}
- 3D model (JSmol): Interactive image
- SMILES: N#Cc1ccc([C@@H]2O[C@H](CO)[C@@H](O)[C@H](O)[C@H]2O)cc1Cc1ccc(C2CC2)cc1
- InChI: InChI=1S/C23H25NO5/c24-11-17-8-7-16(23-22(28)21(27)20(26)19(12-25)29-23)10-18(17)9-13-1-3-14(4-2-13)15-5-6-15/h1-4,7-8,10,15,19-23,25-28H,5-6,9,12H2/t19-,20-,21+,22-,23+/m1/s1; Key:SENUNDCNOYAWGN-ZQGJOIPISA-N; Key:UWKBFNWQMSGEPG-ZHNCTCHCSA-N

Velagliflozin, sold under the brand name Senvelgo, is an antidiabetic medication used for the treatment of cats. Velagliflozin is a sodium-glucose cotransporter 2 (SGLT2) inhibitor. It is taken by mouth.

== Medical uses ==
Velagliflozin is indicated to improve glycemic control in otherwise healthy cats with diabetes not previously treated with insulin.
