= Olorigliflozin =

Investigational drug

Clinical data
- Other names: Rongliflozin; DJT1116PG

Identifiers
- IUPAC name: (1R,2S,3S,4R,5S)-5-[4-chloro-3-[(4-ethoxyphenyl)methyl]phenyl]-1-[(1R)-1-hydroxyethyl]-6,8-dioxabicyclo[3.2.1]octane-2,3,4-triol
- CAS Number: 2035989-50-3
- PubChem CID: 122660464
- ChemSpider: 129498851
- UNII: 6FP3NST6ZQ
- ChEMBL: ChEMBL5314927

Chemical and physical data
- Formula: C_{23}H_{27}ClO_{7}
- Molar mass: 450.91 g·mol^{−1}
- 3D model (JSmol): Interactive image
- SMILES: CCOC1=CC=C(C=C1)CC2=C(C=CC(=C2)[C@@]34[C@@H]([C@H]([C@@H]([C@@](O3)(CO4)[C@@H](C)O)O)O)O)Cl
- InChI: InChI=1S/C23H27ClO7/c1-3-29-17-7-4-14(5-8-17)10-15-11-16(6-9-18(15)24)23-21(28)19(26)20(27)22(31-23,12-30-23)13(2)25/h4-9,11,13,19-21,25-28H,3,10,12H2,1-2H3/t13-,19+,20+,21-,22-,23+/m1/s1; Key:KODGTDKHPNYCCJ-YWRILDCISA-N

Olorigliflozin, also known as rongliflozin, is an investigational new drug that is being evaluated by HEC Pharm for the treatment of type 2 diabetes mellitus. It is a sodium-glucose transporter 2 inhibitor.
