= Sodium/glucose cotransporter 1 =

Mammalian protein found in Homo sapiens

SLC5A1

Identifiers
- Aliases: SLC5A1, D22S675, NAGT, SGLT1, solute carrier family 5 member 1
- External IDs: OMIM: 182380; MGI: 107678; GeneCards: SLC5A1

Gene location (Mouse)
| Chr. | Chromosome 5 (mouse) |
| Band | 5|5 B1 | Start | 33,261,563 bp |
| Band | 5|5 B1 | End | 33,320,214 bp |
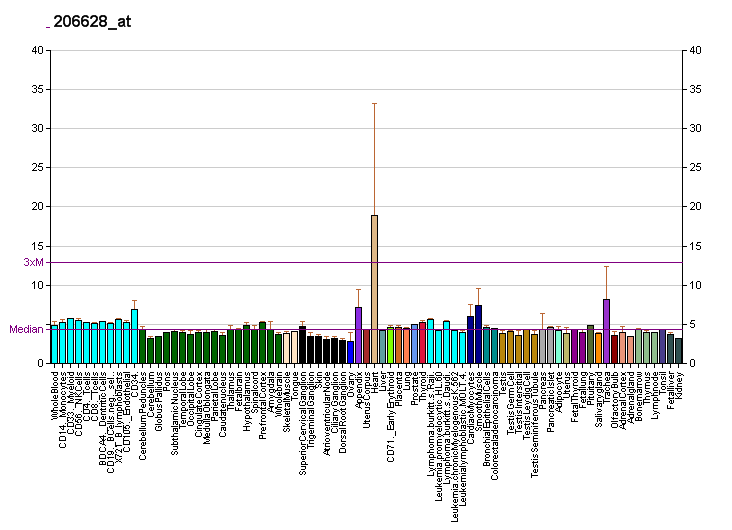
RNA expression pattern
| Bgee | Human / Mouse (ortholog); Top expressed in: jejunal mucosa; duodenum; left ventricle; gallbladder; right ventricle; pancreatic ductal cell; skin of abdomen; islet of Langerhans; minor salivary glands; rectum / Top expressed in: duodenum; ileum; intestinal villus; epithelium of small intestine; jejunum; Ileal epithelium; left colon; Paneth cell; right kidney; crypt of lieberkuhn of small intestine; More reference expression data |
| BioGPS | More reference expression data |
Gene ontology
| Molecular function | transporter activity; protein binding; symporter activity; glucose:sodium symporter activity; transmembrane transporter activity |
| Cellular component | integral component of membrane; membrane; cell-cell junction; plasma membrane; integral component of plasma membrane; brush border membrane; apical plasma membrane; extracellular exosome |
| Biological process | glucose transmembrane transport; sodium ion transport; ion transport; carbohydrate transport; transmembrane transport; intestinal D-glucose absorption; intestinal hexose absorption; transport |
Sources:Amigo / QuickGO
Orthologs
| Databases | NCBI: entry |
| Species | Human | Mouse |
| Entrez | 6523 | 20537 |
| Ensembl | n/a | ENSMUSG00000011034 |
| UniProt | P13866 | Q8C3K6 |
| RefSeq (mRNA) | NM_000343; NM_001256314 | NM_019810 |
| RefSeq (protein) | NP_000334; NP_001243243 | NP_062784 |
| Location (UCSC) | n/a | Chr 5: 33.26 – 33.32 Mb |
| PubMed search |
- Wikidata
| View/Edit Human | View/Edit Mouse |

Sodium/glucose cotransporter 1 (SGLT1) also known as solute carrier family 5 member 1 is a protein in vertebrates that is encoded by the SLC5A1 gene which encodes the production of the SGLT1 protein to line the absorptive cells in the small intestine and the epithelial cells of the kidney tubules of the nephron for the purpose of glucose uptake into cells. Recently, it has been seen to have functions that can be considered as a promising therapeutic target to treat diabetes and obesity in humans. Through the use of the sodium glucose cotransporter 1 protein, cells are able to obtain glucose which is further utilized to make and store energy for the cell.

== Structure ==
The sodium glucose cotransporter 1 is classified as an integral membrane protein that is made up of 14 alpha-helices constructed from the folding of 482-718 amino acid residues with both the N and C-terminal residing upon the extracellular side of the plasma membrane. It is hypothesized that the protein contains protein kinase A and protein kinase C phosphorylation sites, which serve to regulate the proteins conformational shape through phosphorylation of amino acids with ATP.

== Function ==
Glucose transporters are integral membrane proteins that mediate the transport of glucose and structurally related substances across cellular membranes. Two families of glucose transporter have been identified: the facilitated diffusion glucose transporter family (GLUT family), also known as uniporters, and the sodium-dependent glucose transporter family (SGLT family), also known as cotransporters or symporters. The SLC5A1 gene encodes the sodium glucose cotransporter protein that is involved in the facilitated transport of glucose and galactose into eukaryotic and prokaryotic cells. The role of the sodium-glucose cotransporter 1 is to absorb D-glucose and D-galactose from the brush-border membrane of the small intestines, while also exchanging sodium ions and glucose from the tubule of the nephron. The SGLT1 protein is able to uptake glucose through cellular membranes through coupling the energy generated from cotransporting 2 sodium ions with glucose through a symport mechanism. This protein does not use ATP as its energy source.

== Transport mechanism ==
The sodium glucose cotransporter is normally arranged with an outward-facing conformation with open receptors in preparation for 2 sodium ions and glucose to simultaneously bind. Once bound, the protein receptor will change conformation to an occluded conformation, which prevents the dissociation of the sodium ions and glucose. The protein will then change conformations once more to an inward-facing conformation which allows sodium and glucose to dissociate. The protein then returns to the outward-facing conformation state, ready to bind more sodium ions and glucose.

== History ==
=== Cloning ===
Co-transport proteins of mammalian cell membranes had eluded efforts of purification with classical biochemical methods until the late 1980s. These proteins had proven difficult to isolate because they contain hydrophilic and hydrophobic sequences and exist in membranes only in very low abundance (<0.2% of membrane proteins). The rabbit form of SGLT1 was the first mammalian co-transport protein ever to be cloned and sequenced, and this was reported in 1987. To circumvent the difficulties with traditional isolation methods, a novel expression cloning technique was used. Size-fractionation of large amounts of rabbit intestinal mRNA with preparative gel electrophoresis were then sequentially injected into Xenopus oocytes to ultimately find the RNA species that induced the expression of sodium-glucose cotransport.

== Clinical significance ==
SLC5A1 is medically relevant because of its role in the absorption of glucose and sodium, however, mutations in the gene can cause medical implications. A missense mutation in the SLC5A1 gene of exon 1 can cause problems creating the SGLT1 protein, leading to a very rare glucose-galactose malabsorption disease. This is because the mutation destroys the transport function. Glucose-galactose malabsorption occurs when the lining of the intestinal cells cannot take in glucose and galactose which prevents the use of those molecules in catabolism and anabolism. The disease has symptoms that consist of watery and/or acidic diarrhea which is the result of water retention in the intestinal lumen and osmotic loss created by non-absorbed glucose, galactose and sodium. Patients must stick to a diet devoid of these two sugars, or life-threatening diarrhea will occur.

In humans without this genetic disorder, SGLT1 is key to the operation of oral rehydration therapy. By adding sodium and glucose to water, the co-transporter is allowed to transport all three, helping to speed up water absorption.

SLC5A1 expression has been linked to lower survival rates for lung adenocarcinoma patients.

== Tissue distribution ==
The SLC5A1 cotransporter is mainly expressed in the lumen of the small intestine, kidney, parotid glands, submandibular glands and in the heart.

== See also ==
- Solute carrier family
- SGLT Family
- SGLT2

== Interactions ==
SLC5A1 has been shown to interact with PAWR.
