= Sodium-glucose transport proteins =

Group of transport proteins

solute carrier family 5 (sodium/glucose cotransporter), member 1

Identifiers
- Symbol: SLC5A1
- Alt. symbols: SGLT1
- NCBI gene: 6523
- HGNC: 11036
- OMIM: 182380
- RefSeq: NM_000343
- UniProt: P13866

Other data
- Locus: Chr. 22 q13.1
Search for
- Structures: Swiss-model
- Domains: InterPro

solute carrier family 5 (sodium/glucose cotransporter), member 2

Identifiers
- Symbol: SLC5A2
- Alt. symbols: SGLT2
- NCBI gene: 6524
- HGNC: 11037
- OMIM: 182381
- RefSeq: NM_003041
- UniProt: P31639

Other data
- Locus: Chr. 16 p11.2
Search for
- Structures: Swiss-model
- Domains: InterPro

solute carrier family 5 (low affinity glucose cotransporter), member four

Identifiers
- Symbol: SLC5A4
- Alt. symbols: SGLT3, SAAT1, DJ90G24.4
- NCBI gene: 6527
- HGNC: 11039
- RefSeq: NM_014227
- UniProt: Q9NY91

Other data
- Locus: Chr. 22 q12.1-12.3
Search for
- Structures: Swiss-model
- Domains: InterPro

Sodium-dependent glucose cotransporters (or sodium-glucose linked transporter, SGLT) are a family of glucose transporter found in the intestinal mucosa (enterocytes) of the small intestine (SGLT1) and the proximal tubule of the nephron (SGLT2 in PCT and SGLT1 in PST). They contribute to renal glucose reabsorption. In the kidneys, 100% of the filtered glucose in the glomerulus has to be reabsorbed along the nephron (98% in PCT, via SGLT2). If the plasma glucose concentration is too high (hyperglycemia), glucose passes into the urine (glucosuria) because SGLT are saturated with the filtered glucose.

== Types ==
The sodium-glucose linked transporters (SGLTs) are responsible for the active transport of glucose across cell membranes. SGLT1 and SGLT2 are the most well-studied members of this family. Both SGLT1 and SGLT2 function as symporters, utilizing the energy from the sodium gradient created by the Na+/K+ ATPase to transport glucose against its concentration gradient.

SGLT2, encoded by the SLC5A2 gene, is predominantly expressed in the S1 and S2 segments of the proximal renal tubule and is responsible for approximately 97% of glucose reabsorption in the kidneys under normal conditions. SGLT1, encoded by the SLC5A1 gene, is primarily expressed in the late proximal tubule (S3 segment) and accounts for the remaining 3% of glucose reabsorption.

In addition to SGLT1 and SGLT2, there are 10 other members in the human protein family SLC5A.

SLC5A4, also known as SGLT3, is a member of the sodium-glucose cotransporter family. Unlike SGLT1 and SGLT2, which are efficient glucose transporters, SGLT3 functions primarily as a glucose sensor rather than a transporter. It has a low affinity for glucose and does not significantly contribute to glucose transport across cell membranes. Instead, SGLT3 acts as a glucose-gated ion channel, generating small depolarizing currents in response to extracellular glucose. This electrical signaling function suggests a role in glucose sensing and signaling pathways rather than in glucose transport.

Gene	Protein	Acronym	Tissue distribution in proximal tubule	Na^{+}:Glucose Co-transport ratio	Contribution to glucose reabsorption (%)
SLC5A1	Sodium/GLucose coTransporter 1	SGLT1	S3 segment	2:1	10
SLC5A2	Sodium/GLucose coTransporter 2	SGLT2	predominantly in the S1 and S2 segments	1:1	90

The SLC5 family includes transporters for a diverse range of substrates beyond glucose. Specific members of this family are specialized for the transport of:

- Mannose (SLC5A9, also known as SGLT4)
- Myo-inositol (SLC5A3, also known as SMIT1)
- Choline (SLC5A7, also known as CHT1)
- Iodide (SLC5A5, also known as NIS)
- Vitamins, specifically biotin and pantothenate (SLC5A6, also known as SMVT)
- Short-chain fatty acids (SLC5A8 and SLC5A12, also known as SMCT1 and SMCT2 respectively)

Each of these transporters plays a specific role in cellular metabolism and homeostasis, often utilizing sodium gradients for substrate transport similar to the glucose transporters in this family.

== Mechanism ==
The transport of glucose across the proximal tubule cell membrane involves a complex process of secondary active transport (also known as co-transport). This process begins with the Na^{+}/K^{+} ATPase on the basolateral membrane. This enzyme uses ATP to pump 3 sodium ions out of the cell into the blood while bringing 2 potassium ions into the cell. This action creates a sodium concentration gradient across the cell membrane, with a lower concentration inside the cell compared to both the blood and the tubular lumen.

SGLT proteins utilize this sodium gradient to transport glucose across the apical membrane into the cell, even against the glucose concentration gradient. This mechanism is an example of secondary active transport. Once inside the cell, glucose is then moved across the basolateral membrane into the peritubular capillaries by members of the GLUT family of glucose uniporters.

SGLT1 and SGLT2 are classified as symporters because they move sodium and glucose in the same direction across the membrane. To maintain this process, the Sodium–hydrogen antiporter plays a crucial role in replenishing intracellular sodium levels. Consequently, the net effect of glucose transport is coupled with the extrusion of protons from the cell, with sodium serving as an intermediate in this process.

== SGLT2 inhibitors for diabetes ==
SGLT2 inhibitors, also called gliflozins, are used in the treatment of type 2 diabetes. SGLT2 is only found in kidney tubules and in conjunction with SGLT1 resorbs glucose into the blood from the forming urine. By inhibiting SGLT2, and not targeting SGLT1, glucose is excreted which in turn lowers blood glucose levels. Examples include dapagliflozin (Farxiga in US, Forxiga in EU), canagliflozin (Invokana) and empagliflozin (Jardiance). Certain SGLT2 inhibitors have shown to reduce mortality in type 2 diabetes. The safety and efficacy of SGLT2 inhibitors have not been established in patients with type 1 diabetes, and FDA has not approved them for use in these patients.

== History ==
In August 1960, in Prague, Robert K. Crane presented for the first time his discovery of the sodium-glucose cotransport as the mechanism for intestinal glucose absorption.

Crane's discovery of cotransport was the first-ever proposal of flux coupling in biology.

== See also ==
- Cotransport
- Cotransporter
- Glucose-galactose malabsorption
- Renal sodium reabsorption
- Discovery and development of SGLT-2 inhibitors
