= Bexagliflozin =

Antidiabetic medication

Clinical data
- Trade names: Brenzavvy, Bexacat
- AHFS/Drugs.com: Monograph
- MedlinePlus: a623027
- License data: US DailyMed: Bexagliflozin
- Routes of administration: By mouth
- ATC code: A10BK08 (WHO) QA10BK08 (WHO)

Legal status
- Legal status: CA: ℞-only (Veterinary); US: ℞-only

Identifiers
- IUPAC name: (2S,3R,4R,5S,6R)-2-[4-chloro-3-({4-[2-(cyclopropyloxy)ethoxy]phenyl}methyl)phenyl]-6-(hydroxymethyl)oxane-3,4,5-triol
- CAS Number: 1118567-05-7
- PubChem CID: 25195624
- DrugBank: DB12236
- ChemSpider: 26609013
- UNII: EY00JF42FV
- KEGG: D10865
- ChEBI: CHEBI:229225
- ChEMBL: ChEMBL1808388

Chemical and physical data
- Formula: C_{24}H_{29}ClO_{7}
- Molar mass: 464.94 g·mol^{−1}
- 3D model (JSmol): Interactive image
- SMILES: OC[C@H]1O[C@@H](c2ccc(Cl)c(Cc3ccc(OCCOC4CC4)cc3)c2)[C@H](O)[C@@H](O)[C@@H]1O
- InChI: InChI=1S/C24H29ClO7/c25-19-8-3-15(24-23(29)22(28)21(27)20(13-26)32-24)12-16(19)11-14-1-4-17(5-2-14)30-9-10-31-18-6-7-18/h1-5,8,12,18,20-24,26-29H,6-7,9-11,13H2/t20-,21-,22+,23-,24+/m1/s1; Key:BTCRKOKVYTVOLU-SJSRKZJXSA-N

Bexagliflozin, sold under the brand name Brenzavvy, is an antidiabetic medication used to improve glycemic control in adults with type 2 diabetes. It is a sodium-glucose cotransporter 2 (SGLT2) inhibitor that is taken by mouth.

The most common side effects include genital yeast infections, urinary tract infections, and increased urination.

Bexagliflozin was approved for medical use in the United States in January 2023.

== Medical uses ==
Bexagliflozin is indicated to improve glycemic control in adults with type 2 diabetes in combination with diet and exercise.

== Adverse effects ==
Bexagliflozin may cause ketoacidosis, a serious, potentially life-threatening complication that occurs when the body produces high levels of acids in the blood. Bexagliflozin may also cause serious side effects such as an increased incidence for surgery to remove parts of the legs or feet, decreases in blood pressure due to excessive loss of water and sodium from the body, serious infections in the genital region (Fournier's gangrene), very low blood sugar levels when used in combination with insulin or medications that increase insulin in the body, and serious urinary tract infections.

== History ==
The US Food and Drug Administration (FDA) approved bexagliflozin based on evidence from nine clinical trials that enrolled 4,462 adults (2,578 of these participants received bexagliflozin). The nine trials were conducted at 428 sites in 16 countries including the United States, Mexico, Colombia, Japan, the Czech Republic, Poland, Spain, Hungary, France, Canada, Netherlands, Denmark, South Korea, Taiwan, Russia, and Germany. All nine trials were used to assess safety and six of these trials (enrolling 3,346 participants of the 4,462 participants) were used to assess the efficacy of bexagliflozin. The efficacy of bexagliflozin was evaluated in six clinical trials, while the safety of bexagliflozin was evaluated in nine clinical trials of adults with type 2 diabetes whose blood sugar was not well controlled. All participants were required to follow diet and exercise recommendations, but the trials differed with respect to which other drugs participants were allowed to use for diabetes treatment. In four trials, participants were randomly assigned to receive either bexagliflozin or placebo by mouth once daily. In two trials, they received either bexagliflozin or a different diabetes medicine. Neither the participants nor the healthcare providers knew which treatment participants received until after the trial was completed. The benefit of bexagliflozin was evaluated by the change in hemoglobin A1c (HbA1c) between the bexagliflozin and the comparator (either placebo or another diabetes medicine) at the end of the treatment period.

== Society and culture ==
=== Legal status ===
Bexagliflozin was approved for medical use in the United States in January 2023.

== Research ==
A 96-week phase II clinical study of adults with type 2 diabetes showed that bexagliflozin monotherapy provided a durable, clinically meaningful improvement of glycemic control, with a substantial reduction in weight and blood pressure, but no increase in the rate of significant adverse events. In a clinical study of patients with type 2 diabetes and stage 3a/3b chronic kidney disease, bexagliflozin was well tolerated and shown to reduce hemoglobin A1c levels, body weight, systolic blood pressure and albuminuria.

== Veterinary uses ==
The data from two six-month field studies and an extended use field study demonstrated that bexagliflozin was over 80% effective in improving glycemic control in cats with diabetes mellitus.

Bexagliflozin, sold under the brand name Bexacat, is an antidiabetic medication used to improve glycemic control in cats with diabetes. Bexacat is the first sodium-glucose cotransporter 2 (SGLT2) inhibitor new animal drug approved by the US Food and Drug Administration (FDA) in any animal species. It was approved for medical use in the United States in December 2022. Bexacat is sponsored by Increvet Inc., based in Boston, Massachusetts. Elanco licensed development and commercialization rights for bexagliflozin from Bexcafe, an affiliate of Increvet.
