= Daewoong Pharmaceutical =

South Korean pharmaceutical company

Daewoong Pharmaceutical Co., Ltd.
- Native name: 대웅제약
- Type: Public
- Traded as: KRX: 069620
- Industry: Pharmaceutical
- Founded: 1945; 81 years ago
- Headquarters: Seoul, South Korea
- Website: www.daewoong.co.kr

- Daewoong Pharmaceutical
- Hangul: 대웅제약
- Hanja: 大熊製藥
- RR: Daeung jeyak
- MR: Taeung cheyak

Daewoong Pharmaceutical Co., Ltd. (Korean: 대웅제약) is a pharmaceutical company headquartered in Seoul, South Korea. Daewoong Pharmaceutical primarily engages in the manufacture of pharmaceutical products, including prescription and over-the-counter healthcare products.

== History ==
Daewoong Pharmaceutical was established as Kawai Pharmaceutical Company in 1942. Daewoong was officially incorporated in 1945 as Daehan Vitamin Chemical and changed its name to Daehan Vitamin Industrial in 1961. In 1966, Yoon Young-hwan purchased Daehan Vitamin, which was in financial difficulties, and changed its name to the current form, Daewoong Pharmaceutical, in 1978.

== Business ==
As of 2026, the company's growing aesthetics portfolio, centered on the botulinum toxin product Nabota, has become its largest revenue source, and the company has been expanding into fillers and skin boosters while constructing a new toxin manufacturing plant in Hwaseong, Gyeonggi Province, set to be completed in 2027.
