= GC Biopharma =

Pharmaceutical company in Yongin, South Korea

GC Biopharma(Green Cross Corporation)
- Founded: October 5, 1967
- Headquarters: Yongin, South Korea
- Key people: Eun Chul Huh (President)
- Services: Manufacturing and sales of biotheapeutics.
- Website: http://gcbiopharma.com/ http://www.globalgreencross.com/eng/index.do

GC Biopharma also known as Green Cross Corporation is a biopharmaceutical company headquartered in Yongin, South Korea.

== Overview ==
GC Biopharma specializes in the development and commercialization of vaccines, protein therapies, and therapeutic antibodies for use in the fields of oncology and infectious disease.

GC Biopharma was established as "Sudo Microorganism Medical Supplies Co." in 1967, and changed the name to "Green Cross" in 1971. The company is engaged in research, development, manufacturing and sales of biotherapeutics, including plasma proteins, recombinant antibodies, and vaccines. Green Cross developed "Hepavax B", the world's third hepatitis B vaccine, in 1983, the world's first vaccine “Hantavax” against epidemic hemorrhagic fever in 1988, the world's second varicella vaccine in 1995, "Greengene", the world's 4th recombinant antihemophilic drug, and the world's second treatment of Hunter syndrome “Hunterase” in 2012.

As part of GC Biopharma's global strategies, there are three operations based in the overseas as of 2016.

- GC China was established in Anhui Province, China and, has produced plasma derivative products. GC China has established a pharmaceutical wholesaler in 2012.
- GCAM was established in December 2009 to secure plasma supply and enter into the US market. The company, currently runs a total of 8 plasma centers in the US, and collects 400,000 liters of plasma a year that meets FDA standards for facilities and quality and supplies it to Green Cross.
- GCBT is a Montreal-based biopharmaceutical company that was established in 2014 and is Green Cross’ business expansion into the North American and European markets. Building a state-of-the-art manufacturing facility for plasma proteins, GCBT will become the only intravenous immunoglobulin and albumin producer in Canada. It will also serve as a North American hub for the distribution of a variety of therapeutic products from the Green Cross family.
- MOGAM Institute was established in 1984 by Dr. Young-sup Huh who was the first CEO and chairman of GC Biopharma (Green Cross Corporation). In 1970, he dedicated his life to create a sustainable biopharmaceutical industry in South Korea for the benefit of Koreans. Since then, his work led to the development of the world's third Hepatitis B vaccine. In 1984, Dr. Huh founded the MOGAM Institute using all of the profit generated from Green Cross Pharmaceuticals. Since its inception, MOGAM has made significant contributions to Korea's biomedical industry by successfully producing vaccines, diagnostic kits, and important recombinant proteins.

== Products ==
- Plasma proteins
- Recombinant antibody and proteins
- Vaccines
- Prescription drugs
- Consumer healthcare
