= Sodium/glucose cotransporter 2 =

Protein found in humans

SLC5A2
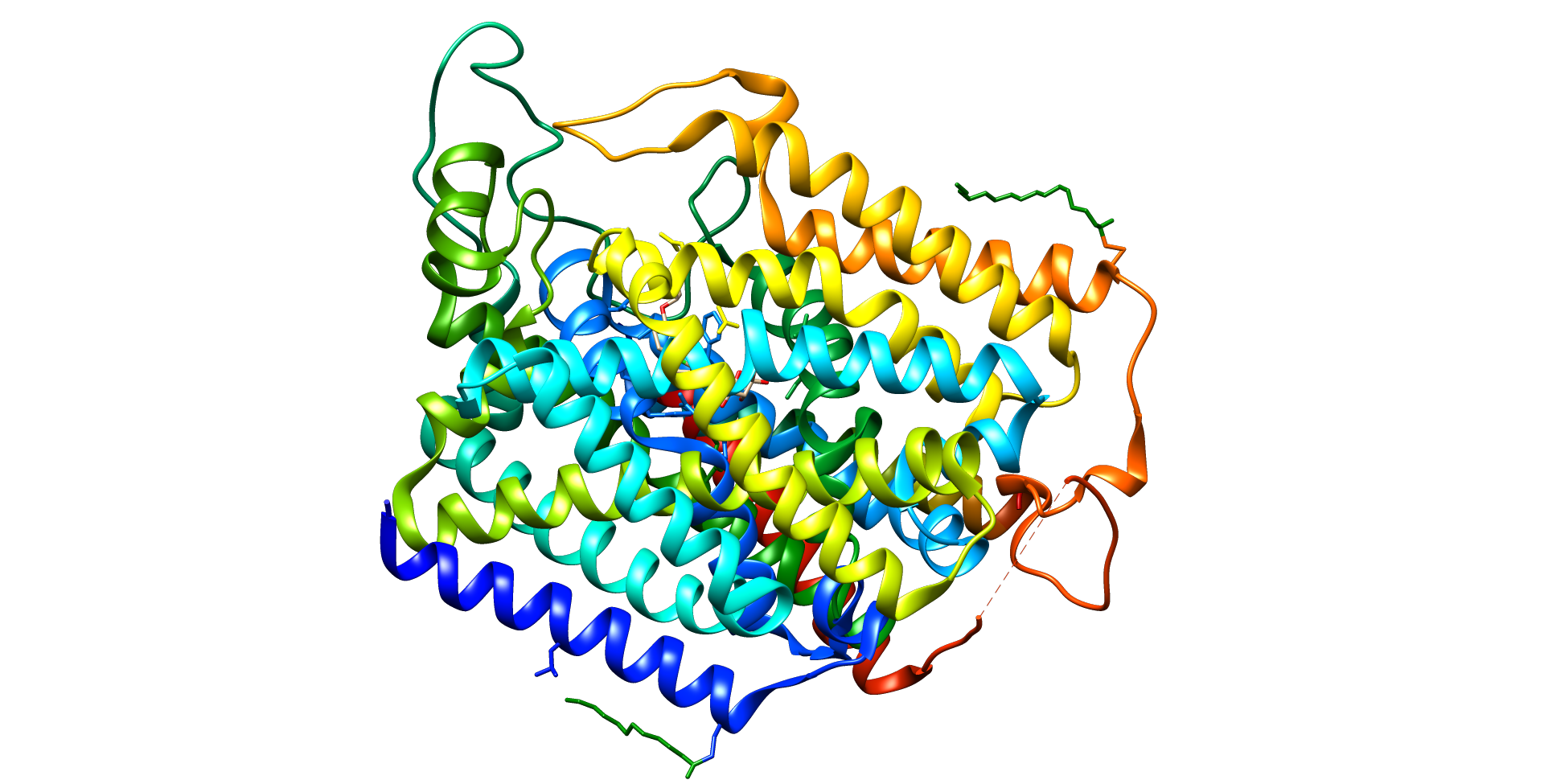

Identifiers
- Aliases: SLC5A2, SGLT2, solute carrier family 5 member 2
- External IDs: OMIM: 182381; MGI: 2181411; GeneCards: SLC5A2
Available structures
PDB	Ortholog search: PDBe RCSB
PDB	List of PDB id codes 7VSI, 7YNK, 7YNJ

Gene location (Human)
Chr.	Chromosome 16 (human)
Band	16p11.2	Start	31,483,002 bp
Band	16p11.2	End	31,490,860 bp

Gene location (Mouse)
Chr.	Chromosome 7 (mouse)
Band	7|7 F3	Start	127,864,829 bp
Band	7|7 F3	End	127,871,602 bp
RNA expression pattern
Bgee	Human / Mouse (ortholog); Top expressed in: kidney tubule; human kidney; testicle; glomerulus; metanephric glomerulus; gonad; epithelium of colon; left testis; right testis; bone marrow cell / Top expressed in: right kidney; human kidney; molar; mucous cell of stomach; supraoptic nucleus; ventromedial nucleus; crypt of lieberkuhn of small intestine; epithelium of small intestine; primary motor cortex; globus pallidus; More reference expression data
BioGPS	n/a
Gene ontology
Molecular function	low-affinity glucose:sodium symporter activity; symporter activity; transporter activity; glucose:sodium symporter activity; transmembrane transporter activity
Cellular component	integral component of membrane; plasma membrane; extracellular exosome; membrane; integral component of plasma membrane
Biological process	carbohydrate transport; ion transport; glucose transmembrane transport; sodium ion transport; transmembrane transport; hexose transmembrane transport; transport; carbohydrate metabolic process
Sources:Amigo / QuickGO
Orthologs
Databases	NCBI: entry; OMA: entry
Species	Human	Mouse
Entrez	6524	246787
Ensembl	ENSG00000140675	ENSMUSG00000030781
UniProt	P31639	Q923I7
RefSeq (mRNA)	NM_003041	NM_133254
RefSeq (protein)	NP_003032	NP_573517
Location (UCSC)	Chr 16: 31.48 – 31.49 Mb	Chr 7: 127.86 – 127.87 Mb
PubMed search
- Wikidata
View/Edit Human	View/Edit Mouse

The sodium/glucose cotransporter 2 (SGLT2) is a protein, which facilitates glucose transport and is regulated by sodium ions. In humans it is encoded by the SLC5A2 solute carrier family 5 (sodium/glucose cotransporter) gene, located in chromosome 16, specifically in the band 16p11.2.

== Function ==
SGLT2 is a member of the sodium glucose cotransporter family, which are sodium-dependent glucose transport proteins. SGLT2 is the major cotransporter involved in glucose reabsorption in the kidney. SGLT2 is located in the early proximal tubule, and is responsible for reabsorption of 80–90% of the glucose filtered by the kidney glomerulus. Most of the remaining glucose absorption is by sodium/glucose cotransporter 1 (SGLT1) in more distal sections of the proximal tubule.

== SGLT2 inhibitors for diabetes ==
SGLT2 inhibitors are also called gliflozins or flozins. They lead to a reduction in blood glucose levels, and therefore have potential use in the treatment of type 2 diabetes. Gliflozins enhance glycemic control as well as reduce body weight and systolic and diastolic blood pressure. The gliflozins canagliflozin, dapagliflozin, and empagliflozin may lead to euglycemic ketoacidosis. Other side effects of gliflozins include increased risk of Fournier gangrene and of (generally mild) genital infections such as candidal vulvovaginitis.

== Clinical significance ==
Mutations in this gene are also associated with renal glycosuria.

Sodium-glucose cotransporter-2 (SGLT2) inhibitors were associated with significant long-term reductions in mortality risk for patients with pulmonary arterial hypertension (PAH), according to an observational cohort study. The study revealed that after one year, 8.1% of PAH patients prescribed SGLT2 inhibitors had died, compared to 15.5% of those who did not take the medication.

== See also ==
- SGLT Family
- Discovery and development of gliflozins
- Phlorizin – a competitive inhibitor of SGLT1 and SGLT2
