= Discovery and development of dipeptidyl peptidase-4 inhibitors =

Drug discovery and development

Dipeptidyl peptidase-4 inhibitors (DPP-4 inhibitors) are enzyme inhibitors that inhibit the enzyme dipeptidyl peptidase-4 (DPP-4). They are used in the treatment of type 2 diabetes mellitus. Inhibition of the DPP-4 enzyme prolongs and enhances the activity of incretins that play an important role in insulin secretion and blood glucose control regulation. Type 2 diabetes mellitus is a chronic metabolic disease that results from inability of the β-cells in the pancreas to secrete sufficient amounts of insulin to meet the body's needs. Insulin resistance and increased hepatic glucose production can also play a role by increasing the body's demand for insulin. Current treatments, other than insulin supplementation, are sometimes not sufficient to achieve control and may cause undesirable side effects, such as weight gain and hypoglycemia. In recent years, new drugs have been developed, based on continuing research into the mechanism of insulin production and regulation of the metabolism of sugar in the body. The enzyme DPP-4 has been found to play a significant role.

== History ==
Since its discovery in 1967, serine protease DPP-4 has been a popular subject of research. Inhibitors of DPP-4 have long been sought as tools to elucidate the functional significance of the enzyme. The first inhibitors were characterized in the late 1980s and 1990s. Each inhibitor was important to establish an early structure activity relationship (SAR) for subsequent investigation. The inhibitors fall into two main classes, those that interact covalently with DPP-4 and those that do not. DPP-4 is a dipeptidase that selectively binds substrates that contain proline at the P1-position, thus many DPP-4 inhibitors have 5-membered heterocyclic rings that mimic proline, e.g. pyrrolidine, cyanopyrrolidine, thiazolidine and cyanothiazolidine. These compounds commonly form covalent bonds to the catalytic residue Ser630.

In 1994, researchers from Zeria Pharmaceuticals unveiled cyanopyrrolidines with a nitrile function group that was assumed to form an imidate with the catalytic serine. Concurrently other DPP-4 inhibitors without a nitrile group were published but they contained other serine-interacting motifs, e.g. boronic acids, phosphonates or diacyl hydroxylamines. These compounds were not as potent because of the similarity of DPP-4 and prolyl oligopeptidase (PEP) and also suffered from chemical instability. Ferring Pharmaceuticals filed for patent on two cyanopyrrolidine DPP-4 inhibitors, which they published in 1995. These compounds had excellent potency and improved chemical stability.

In 1995, Edwin B. Villhauer at Novartis started to explore N-substituted glycinyl-cyanopyrrolidines based on the fact that DPP-4 identifies N-methylglycine as an N-terminal amino acid. This group of new cyanopyrrolidines became extremely popular field of research in the following years. Some trials with dual inhibitors of DPP-4 and vasopeptidase have been represented, since vasopeptidase inhibition is believed to enhance the antidiabetic effect of DPP-4 inhibition by stimulating insulin secretion. Vasopeptidase-inhibiting motif is connected to the DPP-4 inhibitor at the N-substituent.

== DPP-4 mechanism ==
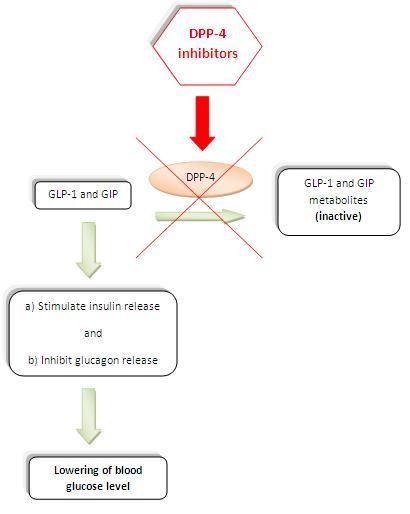

Fig.1: During a meal, the incretins glucagon-like peptide 1 (GLP-1) and glucose-dependent gastric inhibitory polypeptide (GIP) are released by the small intestine into the blood stream. These hormones regulate insulin secretion in a glucose-dependent manner. (GLP-1 has many roles in the human body. It stimulates insulin biosynthesis, inhibits glucagon secretion, slows gastric emptying, reduces appetite and stimulates regeneration of islet β-cells.)

GLP-1 and GIP have extremely short plasma half-lives due to very rapid inactivation, catalyzed by the enzyme DPP-4. Inhibition of DPP-4 slows their inactivation, thereby potentiating their action, leading to lower plasma glucose levels, hence its utility in the treatment of type 2 diabetes. (Figure 1).

=== DPP-4 distribution and function ===
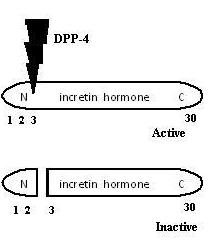
Fig.2: DPP-4 cleaves two amino acids from the N-terminal end of peptides, such as GLP-1.

DPP-4 is attached to the plasma membrane of the endothelium of almost every organ in the body. Tissues which strongly express DPP-4 include the exocrine pancreas, sweat glands, salivary and mammary glands, thymus, lymph nodes, biliary tract, kidney, liver, placenta, uterus, prostate, skin, and the capillary bed of the gut mucosa (where most GLP-1 is inactivated locally). It is also present, in soluble form, in body fluids, such as blood plasma and cerebrospinal fluid. (It also happens that DPP-4 is the CD26 T-cell activating antigen.)

DPP-4 selectively cleaves two amino acids from peptides, such as GLP-1 and GIP, which have proline or alanine in the second position (Figure 2). At the active site where DPP-4 has its effect, there is a characteristic arrangement of three amino acids, Asp-His-Ser. Since alanine and proline are crucial for the biological activity of GPL-1 and GIP, they are inactivated by cleaving away these amino acids. Thus, preventing the degradation of the incretin hormones GLP-1 and GIP by inhibition of DPP-4 has potential as a therapeutic strategy in the treatment of type 2 diabetes.

== DPP-4 characteristics ==
Since DPP-4 is a protease, it is not unexpected that inhibitors would likely have a peptide nature and this theme has carried through to contemporary research.

=== Structure ===
X-ray structures of DPP-4 that have been published since 2003 give rather detailed information about the structural characteristics of the binding site. Many structurally diverse DPP-4 inhibitors have been discovered and it is not that surprising considering the properties of the binding site:

1. A deep lipophilic pocket combined with several exposed aromatic side chains for achieving high affinity small molecule binding.

2. A significant solvent access that makes it possible to tune the physico-chemical properties of the inhibitors that leads to better pharmacokinetic behavior.

DPP-4 is a 766-amino acid transmembrane glycoprotein that belongs to the prolyloligopeptidase family. It consists of three parts; a cytoplasmic tail, a transmembrane region and an extracellular part. The extracellular part is divided into a catalytic domain and an eight-bladed β-propeller domain. The latter contributes to the inhibitor binding site. The catalytic domain shows an α/β-hydrolase fold and contains the catalytic triad Ser630 - Asp708 - His740. The S1-pocket is very hydrophobic and is composed of the side chains: Tyr631, Val656, Trp662, Tyr666 and Val711. Existing X-ray structures show that there is not much difference in size and shape of the pocket that indicates that the S1-pocket has high specificity for proline residues

=== Binding site ===
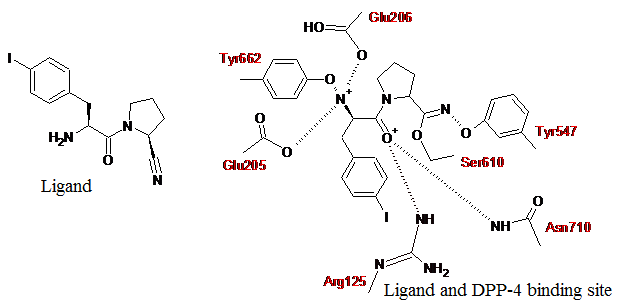
Fig.3: The key interactions between the ligand and DPP-4 complex. The ligand's basic amine forms a hydrogen bonding network. The nitrile reacts with the catalytic active serine and forms an imidate adduct

DPP-4 inhibitors usually have an electrophilic group that can interact with the hydroxyl of the catalytic serine in the active binding site (Figure 3). Frequently that group is a nitrile group but can also be boronic acid or diphenyl phosphonate. This electrophilic group can bind to the imidate complex with covalent bonds and slow, tight-binding kinetics but this group is also responsible for stability issues due to reactions with the free amino group of the P2-amino acid. Therefore, inhibitors without the electrophilic group have also been developed, but these molecules have shown toxicity due to affinity to other dipeptidyl peptidases, e.g. DPP-2, DPP-8 and DPP-9.

DPP-4 inhibitors span diverse structural types. In 2007 few of the most potent compounds contain a proline mimetic cyanopyrrolidine P1 group. This group enhances the potency, probably due to a transient covalent trapping of the nitrile group by the active site Ser630 hydroxyl, leading to delayed dissociation and slow tight binding of certain inhibitors. When these potency enhancements were achieved, some chemical stability issues were noted and more advanced molecules had to be made. To avoid these stability issues, the possibility to exclude the nitrile group was investigated. Amino acids with aryl or polar side chains did not show appreciable DPP-4 inhibition and in fact, all compounds without the nitrile group in this research suffered a 20 to 50-fold loss of potency corresponding to the compounds containing the nitrile group.

== Discovery and development ==
It is important to find a fast and accurate system to discover new DPP-4 inhibitors with ideal therapeutic profiles. High throughput screening (HTS) usually gives low hit rates in identifying the inhibitors but virtual screening (VS) can give higher rates. VS has for example been used to screen for small primary aliphatic amines to identify fragments that could be placed in S1 and S2 sites of DPP-4. On the other hand, these fragments were not very potent and therefore identified as a starting point to design better ones. Three-dimensional models can provide a useful tool for designing novel DPP-4 inhibitors. Pharmacophore models have been made based on key chemical features of compounds with DPP-4 inhibitory activity. These models can provide a hypothetical picture of the primary chemical feature responsible for inhibitory activity. The first DPP-4 inhibitors were reversible inhibitors and came with bad side effects because of low selectivity. Researchers suspected that inhibitors with short half-lives would be preferred in order to minimize possible side effects. However, since clinical trials showed the opposite, the latest DPP-4 inhibitors have a long-lasting effect. One of the first reported DPP-4 inhibitor was P32/98 from Merck. It used thiazolidide as the P1-substitute and was the first DPP-4 inhibitor that showed effects in both animals and humans but it was not developed to a market drug due to side effects. Another old inhibitor is DPP-728 from Novartis, where 2-cyanopyrrolidine is used as the P1-substitute. The addition of the cyano group generally increases the potency. Therefore, researchers' attention was directed to those compounds. Usually, DPP-4 inhibitors are either substrate-like or non-substrate-like.

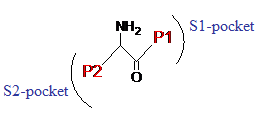
Fig.4: A generic structure of a substrate-like inhibitor

=== Substrate-like inhibitors ===
Substrate-like inhibitors (Figure 4) are more common than the non-substrate-likes. They bind either covalently or non-covalently and have a basic structure where the P1-substituent occupies the S1-pocket and the P2-substituent occupies the S2-pocket. Usually they contain a proline mimetic that occupies the S1-pocket. Large substituents on the 2-cyanopyrrolidine ring are normally not tolerated since the S1-pocket is quite small. Since DPP-4 is identical with the T-cell activation marker CD26 and DPP-4 inhibitors are known to inhibit T-cell proliferation, these compounds were initially thought to be potential immunomodulators. When the function against type 2 diabetes was discovered, the cyanopyrrolidines became a highly popular research material. A little later vildagliptin and saxagliptin, which are the most developed cyanopyrrolidine DPP-4 inhibitors to date, were discovered.

==== Cyanopyrrolidines ====
Cyanopyrrolidines have two key interactions to the DPP-4 complex:

1. Nitrile in the position of the scissile bond of the peptidic substrate that is important for high potency. The nitrile group forms reversible covalent bonds with the catalytically active serine hydroxyl (Ser630), i.e. cyanopyrrolidines are competitive inhibitors with slow dissociation kinetics.

2. Hydrogen bonding network between the protonated amino group and a negatively charged region of the protein surface, Glu205, Glu206 and Tyr662. All cyanopyrrolidines have basic, primary or secondary amine, which makes this network possible but these compounds usually drop in potency if these amines are changed. Nonetheless, two patent applications unveil that the amino group can be changed, i.e. replaced by a hydrazine, but it is claimed that these compounds do not only act via DPP-4 inhibition but also prevent diabetic vascular complications by acting as a radical scavenger.

===== Structure-activity relationship (SAR) =====
Important structure-activity relationship:

1. Strict steric constraint exists around the pyrrolidine ring of cyanopyrrolidine-based inhibitors, with only hydrogen, fluoro, acetylene, nitrile, or methano substitution permitted.

2. Presence of a nitrile moiety on the pyrrolidine ring is critical to achieving potent activity

Also, systematic SAR investigation has shown that the ring size and stereochemistry for the P2 position is quite conditioned. A 5-membered ring and L-configuration has shown better results than a 4-membered or 6-membered ring with D-configuration. Only minor changes on the pyrrolidine ring can be tolerated, since the good fit of the ring with the hydrophobic S1 pocket is very important for high affinity. Some trials have been made, e.g. by replacing the pyrrolidine with a thiazoline. That led to improved potency but also loss of chemical stability. Efforts to improve chemical stability often led to loss of specificity because of interactions with DPP-8 and DPP-9. These interactions have been connected with increased toxicity and mortality in animals. There are strict limitations in the P1 position and hardly any changes are tolerated. On the other hand, a variety of changes can be made in the P2 position. In fact, substitution with quite big branched side chains, e.g. tert-butylglycin, normally increased activity and chemical stability, which could lead to longer-lasting inhibition of the DPP-4 enzyme. It has also been noted that biaryl-based side chains can also give highly active inhibitors. It was originally believed that only lipophilic substitution would be tolerated. Now it is stated that also the substitution of polar negatively charged side-chains as well as hydrophilic substitution can lead to excellent inhibitory activity.

===== Chemical stability =====
Fig.5: Trans-rotamers are more stable than cis-rotamers. Cis-rotamers undergo intramolecular cyclization.

In general, DPP-4 inhibitors are not very stable compounds. Therefore, many researchers focus on enhancing the stability for cyanopyrrolidines. The most widespread technique to improve chemical stability is to incorporate a steric bulk. The two cyanopyrrolidines that have been most pronounced, vildagliptin and saxagliptin, were created in this manner. K579 is a DPP-4 inhibitor discovered by researchers at Kyowa Hakko Kyogo. It had improved not only chemical stability but also a longer-lasting action. That long-lasting action was most likely due to slow dissociation of the enzyme-inhibitor complex and an active oxide metabolite that undergoes enterohepatic circulation. The discovery of the active oxide was in fact a big breakthrough as it led to the development of vildagliptin and saxagliptin. One major problem in DPP-4 inhibitor stability is intramolecular cyclization. The precondition for the intramolecular cyclization is the conversion of the trans-rotamer, which is the DPP-4 binding rotamer (Figure 5). Thus, preventing this conversion will increase stability. This prevention was successful when incorporating an amide group into a ring, creating a compound that kept the DPP-4 inhibitory activity that, did not undergo the intramolecular cyclization and was even more selective over different DPP enzymes. It has also been reported that a cyanoazetidine in the P1 position and a β-amino acid in the P2 position increased stability.

===== Vildagliptin =====
Vildagliptin (Galvus)(Figure 6) was first synthesized in May 1998 and was named after Edwin B. Villhauer. It was discovered when researchers at Novartis examined adamantyl derivatives that had proven to be very potent. The adamantyl group worked as a steric bulk and slowed intramolecular cyclization while increasing chemical stability. Furthermore, the primary metabolites were highly active. To avoid additional chiral center a hydroxylation at the adamantyl ring was carried out (Figure 6). The product, vildagliptin, was even more stable, undergoing intramolecular cyclization 30-times slower, and having high DPP-4 inhibitory activity and longer-lasting pharmacodynamic effect.

===== Saxagliptin =====
Fig.6: The basic structure of cyanopyrrolidines compared with vildagliptin, saxagliptin, and denagliptin

Researchers at Bristol-Myers Squibb found that increased steric bulk of the N-terminal amino acid side-chain led to increased stability. To additionally increase stability the trans-rotamer was stabilized with a cis-4,5-methano substitution of the pyrrolidine ring, resulting in an intramolecular van-der-Waals interaction, thus preventing intramolecular cyclisation. Because of that increased stability, the researchers continued their investigation on cis-4,5-methano cyanopyrrolidines and came across with a new adamantyl derivative, which showed extraordinary ex vivo DPP-4 inhibition in rat plasma. Also noted, high microsomal turnover rate which indicated that the derivative was quickly converted to an active metabolite. After hydroxylation on the adamantyl group they had a product with better microsomal stability and improved chemical stability. That product was named saxagliptin (Onglyza) (Figure 6). In June 2008 AstraZeneca and Bristol-Myers Squibb submitted a new drug application for Onglyza in the United States and a marketing authorization application in Europe. Approval was granted in the United States by the FDA in July 2009 for Onglyza 5 mg and Onglyza 2.5 mg. This was later combined with extended-release metformin (taken once daily) and approved by the FDA in January 2011 under the trade name Kombiglyze XR.

===== Denagliptin =====
Denagliptin (Figure 6) is an advanced compound with a branched side-chain at the P2 position, but also has (4S)-fluoro substitution on the cyanopyrrolidine ring. It is a well-known DPP-4 inhibitor developed by GlaxoSmithKline (GSK). Biological evaluations have shown that the S-configuration of the amino acid portion is essential for the inhibitory activity since the R-configuration showed reluctantly inhibition. These findings will be useful in future designs and synthesis of DPP-4 inhibitors. GSK suspended Phase III clinical trials in October 2008.

==== Azetidine based compounds ====
Informations for this group of inhibitors are quite restricted. Azetidine-based DPP-4 inhibitors can roughly be grouped into three main subcategories: 2-cyanoazetidines, 3-fluoroazetidines, and 2-ketoazetidines. The most potent ketoazetidines and cyanoazetidines have large hydrophobic amino acid groups bound to the azetidine nitrogen and are active below 100nM.

=== Non-substrate-like inhibitors ===
Non-substrate-like inhibitors do not take after dipeptidic nature of DPP-4 substrates. They are non-covalent inhibitors and usually have an aromatic ring that occupies the S1-pocket, instead of the proline mimetic.

In 1999, Merck started a drug development program on DPP-4 inhibitors. When they started internal screening and medicinal chemistry program, two DPP-4 inhibitors were already in clinical trials, isoleucyl thiazolidide (P32/38) and NVP-DPP728 from Novartis. Merck in-licensed L-threo-isoleucyl thiazolidide and its allo stereoisomer. In animal studies, they found that both isomers had similar affinity for DPP-4, similar in vivo efficacy, similar pharmacokinetic and metabolic profiles. Nevertheless, the allo isomer was 10-fold more toxic. The researchers found out that this difference in toxicity was due to the allo isomer's greater inhibition of DPP-8 and DPP-9 but not because of selective DPP-4 inhibition. More research also supported that DPP-4 inhibition would not cause compromised immune function. Once this link between affinity for DPP-8/DPP-9 and toxicity was discovered, Merck decided on identifying an inhibitor with more than a thousandfold affinity for DPP-4 over the other dipeptidases. For this purpose, they used positional scanning libraries. From scanning these libraries, the researchers discovered that both DPP-4 and DPP-8 showed a strong preference for breaking down peptides with a proline at the P1 position but they found a great difference at the P2 site; i.e., they found that acidic functionality at the P2 position could provide a greater affinity for DPP-4 over DPP-8. Merck kept up doing even more research and screening. They stopped working on compounds from the α-amino acid series related to isoleucyl thiazolidide due to lack of selectivity but instead they discovered a very selective β-amino acid piperazine series through SAR studies on two screening leads. When trying to stabilize the piperazine moiety, a group of bicyclic derivatives were made, which led to the identification of a potent and selective triazolopiperazine series. Most of these analogs showed excellent pharmacokinetic properties in preclinical species. Optimization of these compounds finally led to the discovery of sitagliptin.

==== Sitagliptin ====
Fig.7: The structure of sitagliptin

Sitagliptin (Januvia) has a novel structure with β-amino amide derivatives (Figure 7). Since sitagliptin has shown excellent selectivity and in vivo efficacy it urged researchers to inspect the new structure of DPP-4 inhibitors with appended β-amino acid moiety. Further studies are being developed to optimize these compounds for the treatment of diabetes. In October 2006 sitagliptin became the first DPP-4 inhibitor that got FDA approval for the treatment of type 2 diabetes. Crystallographic structure of sitagliptin along with molecular modeling has been used to continue the search for structurally diverse inhibitors. A new potent, selective and orally bioavailable DPP-4 inhibitor was discovered by replacing the central cyclohexylamine in sitagliptin with 3-aminopiperidine. A 2-pyridyl substitution was the initial SAR breakthrough since that group plays a significant role in potency and selectivity for DPP-4.

It has been shown with an X-ray crystallography how sitagliptin binds to the DPP-4 complex:

1. The trifluorophenyl group occupies the S1-pocket

2. The trifluoromethyl group interacts with the side chains of residues Arg358 and Ser209.

3. The amino group forms a salt bridge with Tyr662 and the carboxylated groups of the two glutamate residues, Glu205 and Glu206.

4. The triazolopiperazine group collides with the phenyl group of residue Phe357

Fig.8: The structure of ABT-341

==== Constrained phenylethylamine compounds ====
Researchers at Abbott Laboratories identified three novel series of DPP-4 inhibitors using HTS. After more research and optimization ABT-341 was discovered (Figure 8). It is a potent and selective DPP-4 inhibitor with a 2D-structure very similar to sitagliptin. However, the 3D-structure is quite different. ABT-341 also has a trifluorophenyl group that occupies the S1-pocket and the free amino group, but the two carbonyl groups are orientated 180° away from each other. ABT-341 is also believed to interact with the Tyr547, probably because of steric hindrance between the cyclohexenyl ring and the tyrosine side-chain. Omarigliptin is one of such compound which is in Phase-III development by Merck & Co.

==== Pyrrolidine compounds ====
The pyrrolidine type of DPP-4 inhibitors was first discovered after HTS. Research showed that the pyrrolidine rings were the part of the compounds that fit into the binding site. Further development has led to fluoro substituted pyrrolidines that show superior activity, as well as pyrrolidines with fused cyclopropylrings that are highly active.

=== Xanthine-based compounds ===
This is a different class of inhibitors that was identified with HTS. Aromatic heterocyclic-based DPP-4 inhibitors have gained increased attention recently. The first patents describing xanthines (Figure 10) as DPP-4 inhibitors came from Boehringer-Ingelheim(BI) and Novo Nordisk. When xanthine based DPP-4 inhibitors are compared with sitagliptin and vildagliptin it has shown a superior profile. Xanthines are believed to have higher potency, longer-lasting inhibition and longer-lasting improvement of glucose tolerance.

==== Alogliptin ====
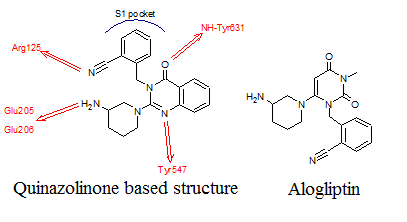
Fig.9: Quinazolinone structure and alogliptin

Alogliptin (Figure 9) is a novel DPP-4 inhibitor developed by the Takeda Pharmaceutical Company. Researchers hypothesized that a quinazolinone based structure (Figure 9) would have the necessary groups to interact with the active site on the DPP-4 complex. Quinazolinone based compounds interacted effectively with the DPP-4 complex, but suffered from low metabolic half-life. It was found that when replacing the quinazolinone with a pyrimidinedione, the metabolic stability was increased and the result was a potent, selective, bioavailable DPP-4 inhibitor named alogliptin. The quinazoline based compounds showed potent inhibition and excellent selectivity over related protease, DPP-8. However, short metabolic half-life due to oxidation of the A-ring phenyl group was problematic. At first, the researchers tried to make a fluorinated derivative. The derivative showed improved metabolic stability and excellent inhibition of the DPP-4 enzyme. However, it was also found to inhibit CYP 450 3A4 and block the hERG channel. The solution to this problem was to replace the quinazolinone with other heterocycles, but the quinazolinone could be replaced without any loss of DPP-4 inhibition. Alogliptin was discovered when quinazolinone was replaced with a pyrimidinedione. Alogliptin has shown excellent inhibition of DPP-4 and extraordinary selectivity, greater than 10.000 fold over the closely related serine proteases DPP-8 and DPP-9. Also, it does not inhibit the CYP 450 enzymes nor block the hERG channel at concentration up to 30 μM. Based on this data, alogliptin was chosen for preclinical evaluation. In January 2007 alogliptin was undergoing the phase III clinical trial and in October 2008 it was being reviewed by the U.S. Food and Drug Administration.

==== Linagliptin ====
Fig.10: The structure of xanthine type inhibitors (TOP) and linagliptin (BOTTOM)

Researchers at BI discovered that using a buty-2-nyl group resulted in a potent candidate, called BI-1356 (Figure 10). In 2008 BI-1356 was undergoing phase III clinical trials; it was released as linagliptin in May 2011. X-ray crystallography has shown that that xanthine type binds the DPP-4 complex in a different way than other inhibitors:

1. The amino group also interacts with the Glu205, Glu206 and Tyr662

2. The buty-2-nyl group occupies the S1-pocket

3. The uracil group undergoes a π-stacking interaction with the Tyr547 residue

4. The quinazoline group undergoes a π-stacking interaction with the Trp629 residue

== Pharmacology ==
Comparative pharmacology of sitagliptin and vildagliptin.
Drug	Absorption	Bioavailability (%)	IC_{50} (nM)	Mean volume of distribution (L)	Protein binding (%)	Half-life (hours,100 mg dose)	Metabolism	Excretion
Sitagliptin	Rapidly absorbed with peak concentration at 1–4 hours	87	18	198	38	12.4	Small fraction undergoes hepatic metabolism via CYP 450 3A4 and 2C8	Excreted in an unchanged form in the urine (79%)
Vildagliptin	Rapidly absorbed with peak concentration at 1–2 hours	85	3	70.5	9.3	1.68 (once a day) and 2.54 (twice a day)	Hydrolysis resulting in a pharmacologically inactive metabolite. A fraction (22%) is also excreted unchanged by the kidneys	Excretion of the metabolite is carried out through urine (85%) and feces (15%)

The pharmacokinetic properties of sitagliptin and vildagliptin appear unaffected by age, sex or BMI. Clinical researches have shown that sitagliptin and vildagliptin do not have the side effects that tend to follow type 2 diabetes treatment, e.g. weight gain and hyperglycemia, but however, other side effects have been observed, including upper respiratory tract infections, sore throat and diarrhea.

== See also ==
- Dipeptidyl peptidase-4
- Dipeptidyl peptidase-4 inhibitors
- Linagliptin
- Vildagliptin
- Sitagliptin
- Saxagliptin
- Berberine
- teneligliptin
- gosogliptin
