= Omarigliptin =

Chemical compound

Clinical data
- Other names: MK-3102
- Routes of administration: Oral
- ATC code: None

Legal status
- Legal status: Developing

Identifiers
- IUPAC name: (2R,3S,5R)-2-(2,5-difluorophenyl)-5-(2-methylsulfonyl-4,6-dihydropyrrolo[3,4-c]pyrazol-5-yl)oxan-3-amine
- CAS Number: 1226781-44-7
- PubChem CID: 46209133
- ChemSpider: 28424182
- UNII: CVP59Q4JE1
- KEGG: D10317
- ChEMBL: ChEMBL2105762
- CompTox Dashboard (EPA): DTXSID70153678
- ECHA InfoCard: 100.207.924

Chemical and physical data
- Formula: C_{17}H_{20}F_{2}N_{4}O_{3}S
- Molar mass: 398.43 g·mol^{−1}
- 3D model (JSmol): Interactive image
- SMILES: CS(=O)(=O)n1cc2c(n1)CN(C2)[C@@H]3C[C@@H]([C@H](OC3)c4cc(ccc4F)F)N
- InChI: InChI=1S/C17H20F2N4O3S/c1-27(24,25)23-7-10-6-22(8-16(10)21-23)12-5-15(20)17(26-9-12)13-4-11(18)2-3-14(13)19/h2-4,7,12,15,17H,5-6,8-9,20H2,1H3/t12-,15+,17-/m1/s1; Key:MKMPWKUAHLTIBJ-ISTRZQFTSA-N

Omarigliptin (MK-3102) is a potent, long-acting oral antidiabetic drug of the DPP-4 inhibitor class used for once-weekly treatment of type 2 diabetes and currently under development by Merck & Co. It inhibits DPP-4 to increase incretin levels (GLP-1 and GIP), which inhibit glucagon release, which in turn increases insulin secretion, decreases gastric emptying and decreases blood glucose levels.

== History ==
Marizev (omarigliptin) 25 mg and 12.5 mg tablets were approved by Japan's Pharmaceuticals and Medical Devices Agency (PMDA) on 28th Sept 2015. Japan was the first country to have approved omarigliptin. However Merck has announced that the company will not submit marketing application in the US and Europe.

== See also ==
- Dipeptidyl peptidase-4 inhibitor
- Alogliptin
- Linagliptin
- Saxagliptin
- Sitagliptin
- Vildagliptin
