= Darren McGuire =

American cardiologist

Darren K. McGuire, MD, MHSc
- Born: Fayetteville, Arkansas, U.S.
- Citizenship: American
- Education: Hendrix College (BA); Johns Hopkins University School of Medicine (MD); Duke University School of Medicine (MHSc)
- Known for: Cardiovascular outcomes in type 2 diabetes, SGLT2 inhibitors, GLP-1 receptor agonists
- Awards: Edwin A. Bierman Award (2024); Luminary in Cardiometabolic Medicine Award (2025)
- Medical career
- Field: Cardiology, clinical trialist, cardiometabolic medicine
- Institutions: University of Texas Southwestern Medical Center; Parkland Health

Darren Keith McGuire, MD, MHSc is an American cardiologist and clinical trialist specializing in cardiovascular disease prevention and cardiometabolic medicine, particularly the relationship between diabetes and heart disease. He is a Distinguished Teaching Professor of Internal Medicine in the Division of Cardiology at the University of Texas Southwestern Medical Center. He also serves as lead physician of the Parkland Health cardiology clinics and holds the Jere H. Mitchell Distinguished Chair in Cardiovascular Science.

== Early life and education ==
McGuire was born in Fayetteville, Arkansas, and grew up and graduated high school in Mountain Home, Arkansas. He earned a Bachelor of Arts in chemistry, summa cum laude and with Distinction from Hendrix College in Conway, Arkansas. He received his Doctor of Medicine from the Johns Hopkins University School of Medicine, where he was elected to the Alpha Omega Alpha Honor Medical Society.

He completed his internship and residency in internal medicine at the University of Texas Southwestern Medical Center, followed by cardiology fellowship training at Duke University School of Medicine. He was a research fellow at the Duke Clinical Research Institute, where he was Chief Fellow from 1999 to 2000, and earned a Master of Health Sciences degree in clinical research.

== Academic and clinical career ==
McGuire joined the faculty of the University of Texas Southwestern Medical Center in 2001. He is Distinguished Teaching Professor of Medicine, holds the Jere H. Mitchell Distinguished Chair in Cardiovascular Science, and since 2001 has served as the lead physician of the Parkland Health System cardiology clinics. He served from 2016 to 2026 as Deputy Editor of Circulation.

== Research ==
McGuire's research focus on type 2 diabetes mellitus, cardiovascular disease, heart failure, and chronic kidney disease.

=== Cardiovascular outcomes in type 2 diabetes ===
A major focus of McGuire's research has been understanding how antihyperglycemic therapies for type 2 diabetes affect cardiovascular risk. His work has helped establish the modern framework of cardiovascular outcome trials (CVOTs), emphasizing the need to demonstrate not only glycemic control but also cardiovascular safety and benefit. He has written on the evolving ethical and scientific challenges of trial design in an era when a number of antihyperglycemic medications have shown cardiovascular protection, advocating for creative trial designs for randomized assessment of novel agents against active comparators with established evidence of efficacy.

=== DPP-4 inhibitor trials ===
McGuire served on the executive committees of four cardiovascular outcome trials (CVOTs) evaluating DPP-4 inhibitors: SAVOR-TIMI 53 (saxagliptin), TECOS (sitagliptin), CAROLINA (linagliptin), and CARMELINA (linagliptin). He was co-chair of CARMELINA. These trials were designed to establish non-inferiority for major adverse cardiovascular events (MACE). SAVOR-TIMI 53 reported an increased risk of hospitalization for heart failure with saxagliptin.

=== GLP-1 receptor agonists and cardiovascular risk reduction ===
McGuire's research has been instrumental in establishing GLP-1 receptor agonists (GLP-1 RAs) as a cornerstone of therapy for reducing cardiovascular risk in persons with type 2 diabetes. He has held leadership roles in numerous CVOTs of GLP-1 receptor agonists (GLP-1 RAs). The results of thes trials in aggregate showed that GLP-1 RAs reduce the risk of MACE (cardiovascular death, non-fatal myocardial infarction, non-fatal stroke) in people with type 2 diabetes.

=== SGLT inhibition ===
McGuire is known for his research on sodium-glucose cotransporter-2 (SGLT2) and SGLT1/2 inhibitors. McGuire has had consultancy and/or trial leadership roles for all SGLT inhibitors presently available for clinical use in the US, and he has contributed to iterative meta-analyses of randomized CVOT trials data on SGLT2 and SGLT1/2 inhibitors. These analyses found that SGLT inhibitors reduce the risk of MACE, hospitalization for heart failure, and progression of chronic kidney disease. The benefits were consistent across patients with and without type 2 diabetes and across varying levels of cardiovascular and kidney risk.

== Awards and honors ==
- Edwin A. Bierman Award for Excellence in Prevention and Treatment of Macrovascular Disease (2024) – American Diabetes Association
- Luminary in Cardiometabolic Medicine Award (2025) – awarded at the Heart in Diabetes Conference for contributions to research innovation, clinical management, and treatment development in cardiometabolic disease
- Recognition as an Outstanding Reviewer for Circulation (American Heart Association journal)
- Fellow of the American Heart Association, the American College of Cardiology, and the European Society of Cardiology
- Excellence in Teaching Award, UT Southwestern Internal Medicine Residency Program
- Odyssey Distinguished Alumni Award in Research, Hendrix College
- Dallas Heart Ball Chair for Research on Heart Disease in Women
- Outstanding Research Mentor Award
- L. David Hillis Award for Excellence in Teaching
- Stanford Citation of Top 2% of Scientists
- Clarivate Highly Cited Researcher

== Selected publications ==
- McGuire, Darren K.; Shih, W.J.; Cosentino, F.; et al. (2021). "Association of SGLT2 Inhibitors With Cardiovascular and Kidney Outcomes in Patients With Type 2 Diabetes: A Meta-analysis". JAMA Cardiology. 6 (2): 148–158. doi:10.1001/jamacardio.2020.4511. PMC 7542529. PMID 33031522.
- McGuire, Darren K.; Busui, R.P.; Deanfield, J.; et al. (2023). "Effects of oral semaglutide on cardiovascular outcomes in individuals with type 2 diabetes and established atherosclerotic cardiovascular disease and/or chronic kidney disease: Design and baseline characteristics of SOUL, a randomized trial". Diabetes, Obesity and Metabolism. 26 (2): 482–494. doi:10.1111/dom.15334. PMID 37846527.
- McGuire, Darren K.; Marx, N.; Mulvagh, S.L.; et al. (2025). "Oral Semaglutide and Cardiovascular Outcomes in High-Risk Type 2 Diabetes". New England Journal of Medicine. 392 (20): 2001–2012. doi:10.1056/NEJMoa2501006. PMID 40162642.
- McGuire, Darren K.; Pagidipati, N.J. (2021). "GLP-1 receptor agonists: from antihyperglycaemic to cardiovascular drugs". The Lancet Diabetes & Endocrinology. doi:10.1016/S2213-8587(21)00155-4 (inactive 15 April 2026).
- Patel, Krishna V.; De Albuquerque Rocha, Natasha; McGuire, Darren K. (2017). "Diabetes medications and cardiovascular outcome trials: Lessons learned". Cleveland Clinic Journal of Medicine. 6 (2): 148–158. doi:10.1001/jamacardio.2020.4511. PMC 7542529. PMID 33031522.
- McGuire, Darren K.; D'Alessio, D.; Nicholls, S.J.; et al. (2022). "Transitioning to active-controlled trials to evaluate cardiovascular safety and efficacy of medications for type 2 diabetes". Cardiovascular Diabetology. 21 (1): 163. doi:10.1186/s12933-022-01601-w. PMC 9400320. PMID 36002856.
- Patel, Krishna V.; McGuire, Darren K. (2019). "Long-term follow-up of intensive glycaemic control in type 2 diabetes". Nature Reviews Cardiology. 16 (9): 517–518. doi:10.1038/s41569-019-0241-y. PMID 31337880.
