= Empagliflozin/linagliptin/metformin =

Combination drug

Combination of
- Empagliflozin: SGLT2 inhibitor
- Linagliptin: DPP-4 inhibitor
- Metformin: Anti-diabetic biguanide

Clinical data
- Trade names: Trijardy XR
- AHFS/Drugs.com: Professional Drug Facts
- License data: US DailyMed: Empagliflozin linagliptin metformin
- Routes of administration: By mouth
- ATC code: A10BD27 (WHO)

Legal status
- Legal status: US: ℞-only

Identifiers
- KEGG: D11856

Empagliflozin/linagliptin/metformin, sold under the brand name Trijardy XR, is a fixed-dose combination medication used for the treatment of type 2 diabetes. It is a combination of empagliflozin, linagliptin, and metformin. Empagliflozin/linagliptin/metformin was approved for use in the United States in January 2020.

== Adverse effects ==
To reduce the risk of developing ketoacidosis (a serious condition where the body produces high levels of blood acids called ketones) after surgery, the FDA has approved changes to the prescribing information for SGLT2 inhibitor diabetes medications, recommending they be temporarily stopped before scheduled surgery. Empagliflozin should each be stopped at least three days before scheduled surgery.

Symptoms of ketoacidosis include nausea, vomiting, abdominal pain, tiredness, and trouble breathing.

== History ==
The combination preparation was developed and marketed by Boehringer Ingelheim Pharmaceuticals, Inc. and Eli Lilly and Company.
