= Dapagliflozin/saxagliptin/metformin =

Combination drug

Combination of
- Dapagliflozin: SGLT-2 inhibitor
- Saxagliptin: DPP‑4 inhibitor
- Metformin: Anti-diabetic biguanide

Clinical data
- Trade names: Qternmet XR, Qtrilmet
- AHFS/Drugs.com: Professional Drug Facts
- License data: US DailyMed: Qternmet
- Routes of administration: By mouth
- ATC code: A10BD25 (WHO)

Legal status
- Legal status: US: ℞-only; EU: Rx-only

Identifiers
- CAS Number: 2447636-43-1
- KEGG: D11711

Dapagliflozin/saxagliptin/metformin, sold under the brand name Qternmet XR among others, is a fixed-dose combination anti-diabetic medication used as an adjunct to diet and exercise to improve glycemic control in adults with type 2 diabetes. It is a combination of dapagliflozin, saxagliptin, and metformin. It is taken by mouth. The drug is marketed by AstraZeneca.

The most common side effects include infections of the nose and throat, hypoglycaemia (low blood sugar) when used with a sulphonylurea and effects on the gut such as nausea (feeling sick), vomiting, diarrhoea, abdominal (tummy) pain and loss of appetite.

Dapagliflozin/saxagliptin/metformin was approved for medical use in the United States in May 2019, and in the European Union in November 2019. Its marketing authorisation was withdrawn in the European Union in August 2020, and its approval was withdrawn in the US in April 2021, in both cases at the request of AstraZeneca.

== Medical uses ==
In the United States, dapagliflozin/saxagliptin/metformin is indicated as an adjunct to diet and exercise to improve glycemic control in adults with type 2 diabetes.

In the European Union it is indicated in adults aged 18 years and older with type 2 diabetes:

- to improve glycemic control when metformin with or without sulphonylurea (SU) and either saxagliptin or dapagliflozin does not provide adequate glycemic control.
- when already being treated with metformin and saxagliptin and dapagliflozin.
