= Vildagliptin/metformin =

Pharmaceutical drug

Combination of
- Vildagliptin: Dipeptidyl peptidase-4 inhibitor
- Metformin: Biguanide antihyperglycemic agent

Clinical data
- Trade names: Eucreas, Galvumet, Zomarist, others
- AHFS/Drugs.com: UK Drug Information
- Routes of administration: By mouth
- ATC code: A10BD08 (WHO)

Legal status
- Legal status: AU: S4 (Prescription only); UK: POM (Prescription only); In general: ℞ (Prescription only)

Identifiers
- CAS Number: 2446159-61-9
- KEGG: D10743

Vildagliptin/metformin, sold under the brand name Eucreas among others, is a fixed-dose combination anti-diabetic medication for the treatment of type 2 diabetes. It was approved for use in the European Union in November 2007, and the approval was updated in 2008. It combines 50 mg vildagliptin with either 500, 850, or 1000 mg metformin.

The most common side effects include nausea (feeling sick), vomiting, diarrhea, abdominal (tummy) pain and loss of appetite.

== Medical uses ==
Vildagliptin/metformin is indicated in the treatment of type-2 diabetes mellitus:

- it is indicated in the treatment of adults who are unable to achieve sufficient glycaemic control at their maximally tolerated dose of oral metformin alone or who are already treated with the combination of vildagliptin and metformin as separate tablets.
- it is indicated in combination with a sulphonylurea (i.e. triple combination therapy) as an adjunct to diet and exercise in patients inadequately controlled with metformin and a sulphonylurea.
- it is indicated in triple combination therapy with insulin as an adjunct to diet and exercise to improve glycaemic control in patients when insulin at a stable dose and metformin alone do not provide adequate glycaemic control.
