= Empagliflozin/linagliptin =

Pharmaceutical drug

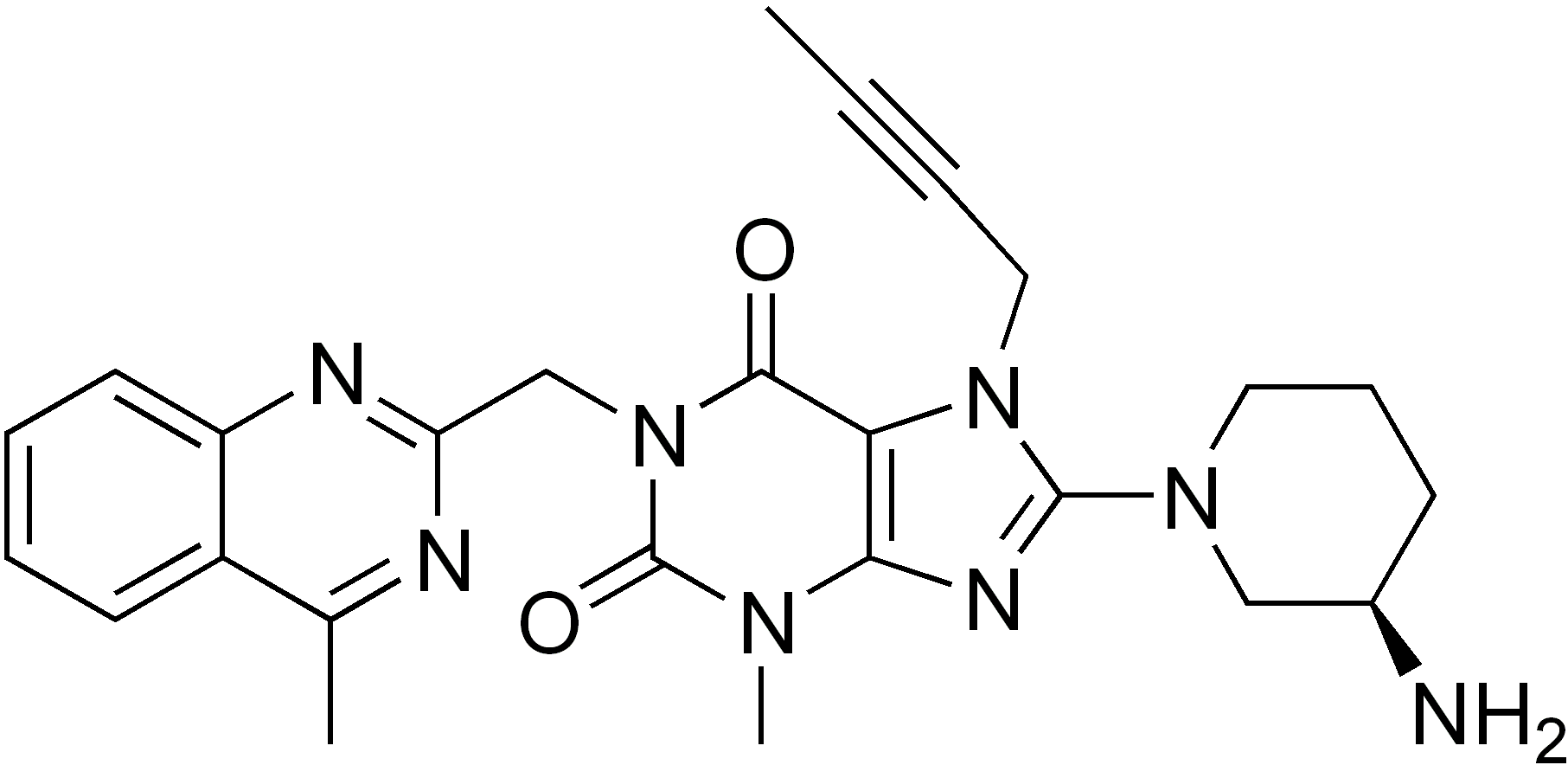

Combination of
- Empagliflozin: SGLT2 inhibitor
- Linagliptin: DPP-4 inhibitor

Clinical data
- Trade names: Glyxambi
- AHFS/Drugs.com: Professional Drug Facts
- License data: US DailyMed: Glyxambi
- Pregnancy category: AU: D
- Routes of administration: By mouth
- ATC code: A10BD19 (WHO)

Legal status
- Legal status: AU: UK: POM (Prescription only); US: ℞-only; EU: Rx-only; In general: ℞ (Prescription only)

Identifiers
- CAS Number: 864070-44-0; 668270-12-0
- PubChem CID: 85364159
- UNII: HDC1R2M35U; 3X29ZEJ4R2
- KEGG: D10588

Chemical and physical data
- Formula: C_{48}H_{55}ClN_{8}O_{9}
- Molar mass: 923.47 g·mol^{−1}
- 3D model (JSmol): Interactive image
- SMILES: CC#CCN1C2=C(N=C1N3CCCC(C3)N)N(C(=O)N(C2=O)CC4=NC5=CC=CC=C5C(=N4)C)C.COC1C(C(C(C(O1)C2=CC(=C(C=C2)Cl)CC3=CC=C(C=C3)OC4CCOC4)O)O)O
- InChI: InChI=1S/C25H28N8O2.C23H27ClO7/c1-4-5-13-32-21-22(29-24(32)31-12-8-9-17(26)14-31)30(3)25(35)33(23(21)34)15-20-27-16(2)18-10-6-7-11-19(18)28-20;1-28-23-21(27)19(25)20(26)22(31-23)14-4-7-18(24)15(11-14)10-13-2-5-16(6-3-13)30-17-8-9-29-12-17/h6-7,10-11,17H,8-9,12-15,26H2,1-3H3;2-7,11,17,19-23,25-27H,8-10,12H2,1H3/t17-;17-,19+,20+,21-,22-,23-/m10/s1; Key:POMOOZUJAXCEKG-QPVQWCQSSA-N

Empagliflozin/linagliptin, sold under the brand name Glyxambi, is a fixed-dose combination anti-diabetic medication used to treat type 2 diabetes. It is a combination of empagliflozin and linagliptin. It is taken by mouth.

The most common side effects include urinary infections, nasopharyngitis, and upper respiratory tract infections .

It was approved for use in the United States in January 2015, for use in the European Union in November 2016, and for use in Australia in December 2016.

== Medical uses ==
In the United States empagliflozin/linagliptin is indicated as an adjunct to diet and exercise to improve glycemic control in adults with type 2 diabetes mellitus and to reduce the risk of cardiovascular death in adults with type 2 diabetes mellitus and established cardiovascular disease.

In the European Union empagliflozin/linagliptin is indicated in adults aged 18 years and older with type 2 diabetes mellitus:

- to improve glycemic control when metformin and/or sulphonylurea (SU) and empagliflozin or linagliptin do not provide adequate glycemic control;
- when already being treated with the free combination of empagliflozin and linagliptin.

== Adverse effects ==
The most common side effects include urinary infections, nasopharyngitis, and upper respiratory tract infections . The most serious side effects include ketoacidosis (high blood levels of acids called ‘ketoacids’), pancreatitis (inflammation of the pancreas), hypersensitivity (allergic reactions) and hypoglycaemia (low blood sugar levels).

== History ==
The combination preparation was developed and is marketed by Boehringer Ingelheim and Eli Lilly and Company under the brand name Glyxambi.
