= Fotagliptin =

Chemical compound

Clinical data
- Other names: SAL067

Legal status
- Legal status: Investigational

Identifiers
- IUPAC name: 2-[[3-[(3R)-3-Aminopiperidin-1-yl]-6-methyl-5-oxo-1,2,4-triazin-4-yl]methyl]-4-fluorobenzonitrile
- CAS Number: 1312954-58-7
- PubChem CID: 53258570
- ChemSpider: 88297640
- ChEMBL: ChEMBL5408495

Chemical and physical data
- Formula: C_{17}H_{19}FN_{6}O
- Molar mass: 342.378 g·mol^{−1}

Fotagliptin (SAL067) is a DPP-4 inhibitor under development for the treatment of type 2 diabetes. Like other DPP-4 inhibitors, it works by increasing endogenously produced GLP-1 and GIP. In a phase 3 trial it showed similar results as alogliptin.
