= Jalra =

Jalra may refer to:

- Taal: a pair of clash cymbals from India
- One of the trade names for Vildagliptin
