= Retagliptin =

Chemical compound

Identifiers
- IUPAC name: Methyl 7-[(3R)-3-amino-4-(2,4,5-trifluorophenyl)butanoyl]-3-(trifluoromethyl)-6,8-dihydro-5H-imidazo[1,5-a]pyrazine-1-carboxylate
- CAS Number: 1174122-54-3
- PubChem CID: 44193830
- DrugBank: DB14898
- ChemSpider: 57583801
- UNII: 328C4R3P9L
- ChEMBL: ChEMBL4297435

Chemical and physical data
- Formula: C_{19}H_{18}F_{6}N_{4}O_{3}
- Molar mass: 464.368 g·mol^{−1}
- 3D model (JSmol): Interactive image
- SMILES: COC(=O)C1=C2CN(CCN2C(=N1)C(F)(F)F)C(=O)C[C@@H](CC3=CC(=C(C=C3F)F)F)N
- InChI: InChI=1S/C19H18F6N4O3/c1-32-17(31)16-14-8-28(2-3-29(14)18(27-16)19(23,24)25)15(30)6-10(26)4-9-5-12(21)13(22)7-11(9)20/h5,7,10H,2-4,6,8,26H2,1H3/t10-/m1/s1; Key:WIIAMRXFUJLYEF-SNVBAGLBSA-N

Retagliptin is a DPP-4 inhibitor studied for the treatment of type 2 diabetes.

In 2023, it was approved in China by the National Medical Products Administration for blood glucose control for adult patients with type 2 diabetes.
