= Diabetes medication =

Drugs that lower blood glucose levels to treat diabetes

Drugs used in diabetes treat types of diabetes mellitus by decreasing glucose levels in the blood. There are different classes of drugs for treating diabetes, and selection of the appropriate agent depends on the nature of the diabetes (Type I vs Type II), the age and situation of the person, as well as other patient factors.

Type 1 diabetes is an endocrine disorder characterized by hyperglycemia due to autoimmune destruction of insulin-secreting pancreatic beta cells. Insulin is a hormone needed by cells to take in glucose from the blood. Insufficient levels of insulin due to Type 1 diabetes can lead to chronic hyperglycemia and eventual multiorgan damage, resulting in renal, neurologic, cardiovascular, and other serious complications. The treatment for Type 1 diabetes involves regular insulin injections.

Type 2 diabetes, the most common type of diabetes, occurs when cells exhibit insulin resistance and become unable to properly utilize insulin. Insulin resistance requires the pancreas to compensate by increasing insulin production. Once compensation fails, chronic hyperglycemia can manifest and type 2 diabetes develops. Treatments include dietary changes emphasizing low glycemic index food, physical activity to improve insulin sensitivity, and medications that (1) increase the amount of insulin secreted by the pancreas, (2) increase the sensitivity of target organs to insulin, (3) decrease the rate at which glucose is absorbed from the gastrointestinal tract, and (4) increase the loss of glucose through urination.

Several drug classes are indicated for use in type 2 diabetes and are often used in combination. Therapeutic combinations may include several insulin isoforms or varying classes of oral antihyperglycemic agents. As of 2020, 23 unique antihyperglycemic drug combinations were approved by the FDA. The first triple combination of oral anti-diabetics was approved in 2019, consisting of metformin, saxagliptin, and dapagliflozin. Another triple combination approval for metformin, linagliptin, and empagliflozin followed in 2020.

Most GLP-1 receptor agonists (liraglutide, exenatide, tirzepatide, pramlintide and others) are administered by injection. Other anti-diabetes medications (including semaglutide as Rybelsus) are administered orally and are thus called oral hypoglycemic agents or oral antihyperglycemic agents. (Semaglutide is available both as a pill and as an injection.)

== Mechanisms of action ==
Diabetes medications have four main mechanisms of action:

- Insulin sensitization: Increased sensitivity of insulin receptors on cells leading to decreased insulin resistance, and higher effects of insulin on blood glucose levels.
- Stimulation of beta cells: This stimulation increases insulin secretion from beta cells of pancreas.
- Alpha-glucosidase inhibition: Inhibition of the alpha-glucosidase enzyme, decreases the rate at which glucose is absorbed from the gastrointestinal tract.
- Alpha-amylase inhibition: Inhibition of the alpha-amylase enzyme, decreasing the digestion of starch.
- SGLT2 inhibition: Inhibition of sodium-glucose transport protein 2 (SGLT2) decreases glucose reabsorption in the renal tubules of nephrons, thus increasing the amount of glucose excreted in urine.

== Insulin ==
Insulin is usually given subcutaneously, either by injections or by an insulin pump. In acute care settings, insulin may also be given intravenously. Insulins are typically characterized by the rate at which they are metabolized by the body, yielding different peak times and durations of action. Faster-acting insulins peak quickly and are subsequently metabolized, while longer-acting insulins tend to have extended peak times and remain active in the body for more significant periods.

Examples of rapid-acting insulins (peak at ~1 hour) are:

- Insulin lispro (Humalog)
- Insulin aspart (Novolog)
- Insulin glulisine (Apidra)

Examples of short-acting insulins (peak 2–4 hours) are:

- Regular insulin (Humulin R, Novolin R)
- Prompt insulin zinc (Semilente)

Examples of intermediate-acting insulins (peak 4–10 hours) are:

- Isophane insulin, neutral protamine Hagedorn (NPH) (Humulin N, Novolin N)
- Insulin zinc (Lente)

Examples of long-acting insulins (duration 24 hours, often without peak) are:

- Extended insulin zinc insulin (Ultralente)
- Insulin glargine (Lantus)
- Insulin detemir (Levemir)
- Insulin degludec (Tresiba)

Insulin degludec is sometimes classed separately as an "ultra-long" acting insulin due to its duration of action of about 42 hours, compared with 24 hours for most other long-acting insulin preparations.

As a systematic review of studies comparing insulin detemir, insulin glargine, insulin degludec and NPH insulin did not show any clear benefits or serious adverse effects for any particular form of insulin for nocturnal hypoglycemia, severe hypoglycemia, glycated hemoglobin A1c, non-fatal myocardial infarction/stroke, health-related quality of life or all-cause mortality. The same review did not find any differences in effects of using these insulin analogues between adults and children. NPH insulin is an older intermediate-acting form of insulin. They both provide coverage to lower blood glucose levels bwtween meals.

Most oral anti-diabetic agents are contraindicated in pregnancy, in which case insulin is preferred.

Insulin is not administered by other routes, although this has been studied. An inhaled form was briefly licensed but was subsequently withdrawn.

== Sensitizers ==
Insulin sensitizers address the core problem in type 2 diabetes – insulin resistance.

=== Biguanides ===
Biguanides reduce hepatic glucose output and increase uptake of glucose by the periphery, including skeletal muscle. Although it must be used with caution in patients with impaired liver or kidney function, Metformin, a biguanide, has become the most commonly used agent for type 2 diabetes in children and teenagers. Among common diabetic drugs, Metformin is the only widely used oral drug that does not cause weight gain.

Typical reduction in glycated hemoglobin (A1C) values for Metformin is 1.5–2.0%

- Metformin (Glucophage) may be the best choice for patients who also have heart failure, but it should be temporarily discontinued before any radiographic procedure involving intravenous iodinated contrast, as patients are at an increased risk of lactic acidosis.
- Phenformin (DBI) was used from 1960s through 1980s, but was withdrawn due to lactic acidosis risk.
- Buformin also was withdrawn due to lactic acidosis risk.

Metformin is a first-line medication used for treatment of type 2 diabetes. It is generally prescribed at initial diagnosis in conjunction with exercise and weight loss, as opposed to the past, where it was prescribed after diet and exercise had failed. There is an immediate-release as well as an extended-release formulation, typically reserved for patients experiencing gastrointestinal side-effects. It is also available in combination with other oral diabetic medications.

=== Thiazolidinediones ===
Thiazolidinediones (TZDs), also known as "glitazones," bind to PPARγ, peroxisome proliferator activated receptor γ, a type of nuclear regulatory protein involved in the transcription of genes that regulate glucose and fat metabolism. These PPARs act on peroxisome proliferator responsive elements (PPRE). The PPREs influence insulin-sensitive genes, which enhance production of mRNAs of insulin-dependent enzymes. The final result is better use of glucose by the cells. These drugs also enhance PPAR-α activity and hence lead to a rise in HDL and some larger components of LDL.

Typical reductions in glycated hemoglobin (A1C) values are 1.5–2.0%. Some examples are:

- Rosiglitazone (Avandia): the European Medicines Agency recommended in September 2010 that it be suspended from the EU market due to elevated cardiovascular risks.
- Pioglitazone (Actos): remains on the market but has also been associated with increased cardiovascular risks.
- Troglitazone (Rezulin): used in 1990s, withdrawn due to hepatitis and liver damage risk.

Multiple retrospective studies have resulted in a concern about rosiglitazone's safety, although it is established that the group, as a whole, has beneficial effects on diabetes. The greatest concern is an increase in the number of severe cardiac events in patients taking it. The ADOPT study showed that initial therapy with drugs of this type may prevent the progression of disease, as did the DREAM trial. The American Association of Clinical Endocrinologists (AACE), which provides clinical practice guidelines for management of diabetes, retains thiazolidinediones as recommended first, second, or third line agents for type 2 diabetes mellitus, as of their 2019 executive summary, over sulfonylureas and α-glucosidase inhibitors. However, they are less preferred than GLP-1 agonists or SGLT2 inhibitors, especially in patients with cardiovascular disease (which liraglutide, empagliflozin, and canagliflozin are all FDA approved to treat).

Concerns about the safety of rosiglitazone arose when a retrospective meta-analysis was published in the New England Journal of Medicine. There have been a significant number of publications since then, and a Food and Drug Administration panel voted, with some controversy, 20:3 that available studies "supported a signal of harm", but voted 22:1 to keep the drug on the market. The meta-analysis was not supported by an interim analysis of the trial designed to evaluate the issue, and several other reports have failed to conclude the controversy. This weak evidence for adverse effects has reduced the use of rosiglitazone, despite its important and sustained effects on glycemic control. Safety studies are continuing.

In contrast, at least one large prospective study, PROactive 05, has shown that pioglitazone may decrease the overall incidence of cardiac events in people with type 2 diabetes who have already had a heart attack.

=== LYN Kinase Activators ===
The LYN kinase activator Tolimidone has been reported to potentiate insulin signaling in a manner that is distinct from the glitazones. The compound has demonstrated positive results in a Phase 2a clinical study involving 130 diabetic subjects.

== Secretagogues ==
Secretagogues are drugs that increase output from a gland, in the case of insulin from the pancreas.

=== Sulfonylureas ===
Sulfonylureas were the first widely used oral anti-hyperglycemic medications. They are insulin secretagogues, triggering insulin release by inhibiting the K_{ATP} channel of the pancreatic beta cells. Eight types of these pills have been marketed in North America, but not all remain available. The "second-generation" sulfonylureas are now more commonly used. They are more effective than first-generation drugs and have fewer side-effects. All may cause weight gain.

Current clinical practice guidelines from the AACE rate sulfonylureas (as well as glinides) below all other classes of antidiabetic drugs in terms of suggested use as first, second, or third line agents - this includes Bromocriptine, the bile acid sequestrant Colesevelam, α-glucosidase inhibitors, Thiazolidinediones (glitazones), and DPP-4 inhibitors (gliptins). The low cost of most sulfonylureas, however, especially when considering their significant efficacy in blood glucose reduction, tends to keep them as a more feasible option in many patients - neither SGLT2 inhibitors nor GLP-1 agonists, the classes most favored by the AACE guidelines after metformin, are currently available as generics.

Sulfonylureas bind strongly to plasma proteins. Sulfonylureas are useful only in type 2 diabetes, as they work by stimulating endogenous release of insulin. They work best with patients over 40 years old who have had diabetes mellitus for under ten years. They cannot be used with type 1 diabetes, or diabetes of pregnancy. They can be safely used with metformin or glitazones. The primary side-effect is hypoglycemia, which appears to happen more commonly with sulfonylureas than with other treatments.

A Cochrane systematic review from 2011 showed that treatment with Sulfonylureas did not improve control of glucose levels more than insulin at 3 nor 12 months of treatment. This same review actually found evidence that treatment with Sulfonylureas could lead to earlier insulin dependence, with 30% of cases requiring insulin at 2 years. When studies measured fasting C-peptide, no intervention influenced its concentration, but insulin maintained concentration better compared to Sulphonylurea. Still, it is important to highlight that the studies available to be included in this review presented considerable flaws in quality and design.

Typical reductions in glycated hemoglobin (A1C) values for second-generation sulfonylureas are 1.0–2.0%.

- First-generation agents
  - tolbutamide
  - acetohexamide
  - tolazamide
  - chlorpropamide
- Second-generation agents
  - glipizide
  - glyburide or glibenclamide
  - glimepiride
  - gliclazide
  - glyclopyramide
  - gliquidone

=== Meglitinides ===
Meglitinides help the pancreas produce insulin and are often called "short-acting secretagogues." They act on the same potassium channels as sulfonylureas, but at a different binding site. By closing the potassium channels of the pancreatic beta cells, they open the calcium channels, thereby enhancing insulin secretion.

They are taken with or shortly before meals to boost the insulin response to each meal. If a meal is skipped, the medication is also skipped.

Typical reductions in glycated hemoglobin (A1C) values are 0.5–1.0%.

- repaglinide
- nateglinide

Adverse reactions include weight gain and hypoglycemia.

== Alpha-glucosidase inhibitors ==
Alpha-glucosidase inhibitors are a class of diabetes drugs found in plants/herbs like cinnamon; however, they are technically not hypoglycemic agents because they do not have a direct effect on insulin secretion or sensitivity. These agents slow the digestion of starch in the small intestine, such that glucose from the starch enters the bloodstream at a slower rate, and can be matched more effectively by an impaired insulin response or sensitivity. The intake of a single dose before a meal containing complex carbohydrates clearly suppresses the glucose spike and may decrease the postprandial hyperglycemia (higher than 140 mg/dL; >7.8 mmol/L) in patients with type II diabetes. These agents are effective by themselves only in the earliest stages of impaired glucose tolerance, but can be helpful in combination with other agents in type 2 diabetes.

Typical reductions in glycated hemoglobin (A1C) values are 0.5–1.0%.

- miglitol
- acarbose
- voglibose

These medications are rarely used in the United States because of the severity of their side-effects (flatulence and bloating). They are more commonly prescribed in Europe. They do have the potential to cause weight loss by lowering the amount of sugar metabolized.

== Peptide analogs ==
Overview of insulin secretion

=== Injectable incretin mimetics ===
Incretins are also insulin secretagogues. The two main candidate molecules that fulfill criteria for being an incretin are glucagon-like peptide-1 (GLP-1) and gastric inhibitory peptide (glucose-dependent insulinotropic peptide, GIP). Both GLP-1 and GIP are rapidly inactivated by the enzyme dipeptidyl peptidase-4 (DPP-4).

==== Injectable glucagon-like peptide analogs and agonists ====
Glucagon-like peptide (GLP) agonists bind to a membrane GLP receptor. As a consequence, insulin release from the pancreatic beta cells is increased. Endogenous GLP has a half-life of only a few minutes, thus an analogue of GLP would not be practical. As of 2019, the AACE lists GLP-1 agonists, along with SGLT2 inhibitors, as the most preferred anti-diabetic agents after metformin. Liraglutide in particular may be considered first-line in diabetic patients with cardiovascular disease, as it has received FDA approval for reduction of risk of major adverse cardiovascular events in patients with type 2 diabetes. In a 2011 Cochrane review, GLP-1 agonists showed approximately a 1% reduction in HbA1c when compared to placebo. GLP-1 agonists also show improvement of beta-cell function, but this effect does not last after treatment is stopped. Due to shorter duration of studies, this review did not allow for long-term positive or negative effects to be assessed.

- Exenatide (also Exendin-4, marketed as Byetta) is the first GLP-1 agonist approved for the treatment of type 2 diabetes. Exenatide is not an analogue of GLP but rather a GLP agonist. Exenatide has only 53% homology with GLP, which increases its resistance to degradation by DPP-4 and extends its half-life. A 2011 Cochrane review showed a HbA1c reduction of 0.20% more with Exenatide 2 mg compared to insulin glargine, exenatide 10 μg twice daily, sitagliptin and pioglitazone. Exenatide, together with liraglutide, led to greater weight loss than glucagon-like peptide analogues.
- Liraglutide, a once-daily human analogue (97% homology), was developed by Novo under the brand name Victoza. The product was approved by the European Medicines Agency (EMEA) on July 3, 2009, and by the U.S. Food and Drug Administration (FDA) on January 25, 2010. A 2011 Cochrane review showed a HbA1c reduction of 0.24% more with liraglutide 1.8 mg compared to insulin glargine, 0.33% more than exenatide 10 μg twice daily, sitagliptin and rosiglitazone. Liraglutide, together with exenatide, led to greater weight loss than glucagon-like peptide analogues.
- Taspoglutide is presently in Phase III clinical trials with Hoffman-La Roche.
- Lixisenatide (Lyxumia) Sanofi Aventis
- Semaglutide (Ozempic) (oral version is Rybelsus)
- Dulaglutide (Trulicity) - once weekly GLP-1; manufactured by Eli Lilly
- Albiglutide (Tanzeum) - once weekly
- Tirzepatide - once weekly (dual GLP-1 and GIP agonist; manufactured by Eli Lilly, and approved in 2022. It is marketed under the brand name Mounjaro for type II diabetes, and Zepbound for obesity.)

These agents may also cause a decrease in gastric motility, responsible for the common side-effect of nausea, which tends to subside with time.

==== Dipeptidyl peptidase-4 inhibitors ====
GLP-1 analogs resulted in weight loss and had more gastrointestinal side-effects, while in general dipeptidyl peptidase-4 (DPP-4) inhibitors were weight-neutral and are associated with increased risk for infection and headache. Both classes appear to present an alternative to other antidiabetic drugs. However, weight gain and/or hypoglycemia have been observed when dipeptidyl peptidase-4 inhibitors were used with sulfonylureas; effects on long-term health and morbidity rates are still unknown.

DPP-4 inhibitors increase blood concentration of the incretin GLP-1 by inhibiting its degradation by DPP-4.

Examples are:

- vildagliptin (Galvus) EU Approved 2008
- sitagliptin (Januvia) FDA approved Oct 2006
- saxagliptin (Onglyza) FDA Approved July 2009
- linagliptin (Tradjenta) FDA Approved May 2, 2011
- alogliptin
- septagliptin
- teneligliptin
- gemigliptin (Zemiglo)

DPP-4 inhibitors lowered hemoglobin A1C values by 0.74%, comparable to other antidiabetic drugs.

A result in one RCT comprising 206 patients aged 65 or older (mean baseline HgbA1c of 7.8%) receiving either 50 or 100 mg/d of sitagliptin was shown to reduce HbA1c by 0.7% (combined result of both doses). A combined result of 5 RCTs enlisting a total of 279 patients aged 65 or older (mean baseline HbA1c of 8%) receiving 5 mg/d of saxagliptin was shown to reduce HbA1c by 0.73%. A combined result of 5 RCTs enlisting a total of 238 patients aged 65 or older (mean baseline HbA1c of 8.6%) receiving 100 mg/d of vildagliptin was shown to reduce HbA1c by 1.2%. Another set of 6 combined RCTs involving alogliptin (approved by FDA in 2013) was shown to reduce HbA1c by 0.73% in 455 patients aged 65 or older who received 12.5 or 25 mg/d of the medication.

=== Injectable amylin analogues ===
Amylin agonist analogues slow gastric emptying and suppress glucagon. They have all the incretins actions except stimulation of insulin secretion. As of 2007, pramlintide is the only clinically available amylin analogue. Like insulin, it is administered by subcutaneous injection. The most frequent and severe adverse effect of pramlintide is nausea, which occurs mostly at the beginning of treatment and gradually reduces. Typical reductions in A1C values are 0.5–1.0%.

== SGLT2 inhibitors ==
SGLT2 inhibitors block the sodium-glucose linked transporter 2 proteins in renal tubules of nephrons in kidneys, reabsorption of glucose in into the renal tubules, promoting excretion of glucose in the urine. This causes both mild weight loss, and a mild reduction in blood sugar levels with little risk of hypoglycemia. Oral preparations may be available alone or in combination with other agents. Along with GLP-1 agonists, they are considered preferred second or third agents for type 2 diabetics sub-optimally controlled with metformin alone, according to most recent clinical practice guidelines. Because they are taken by mouth, rather than injected (like GLP-1 agonists), patients who are injection-averse may prefer these agents over the former. They may be considered first line in diabetic patients with cardiovascular disease, especially heart failure, as these medications have been shown to reduce the risk of hospitalization in patients with such comorbidities. Because they are not available as generic medications, however, cost may limit their feasibility for many patients. Furthermore, there has been growing evidence that the effectiveness and safety of this drug class could depend on genetic variability of the patients.

Examples include:

- Dapagliflozin
- Canagliflozin
- Empagliflozin
- Remogliflozin

The side effects of SGLT2 inhibitors are derived directly from their mechanism of action; these include an increased risk of: ketoacidosis, urinary tract infections, candidal vulvovaginitis, and hypoglycemia.

== Comparison ==
The following table compares some common anti-diabetic agents, generalizing classes, although there may be substantial variation in individual drugs of each class. When the table makes a comparison such as "lower risk" or "more convenient" the comparison is with the other drugs on the table.

Comparison of anti-diabetic medication
Drug class	Mechanism of action	Advantages	Disadvantages
Sulfonylureas (glyburide, glimepiride, glipizide)	Stimulating insulin release by pancreatic beta cells by inhibiting the K_{ATP} channel	Inexpensive; Fast onset of action; No effect on blood pressure; No detrimental effect on low-density lipoprotein; Lower risk of gastrointestinal side effects than metformin; Convenient dosing	Cause an average of 2–5 kg weight gain; Increase the risk of hypoglycemia; Glyburide increases risk of hypoglycemia slightly more compared to glimepiride and glipizide
Metformin	Acts on the liver to reduce gluconeogenesis and causes a decrease in insulin resistance via increasing AMPK signalling.	Associated with weight loss; Lower risk of hypoglycemia compared to other antidiabetics; Decreases low-density lipoprotein; Decreases triglycerides; No effect on blood pressure; Lowered all-cause mortality in diabetics; Inexpensive	Higher risk of gastrointestinal side effects; Due to the risk of potentially fatal lactic acidosis, contraindicated in people with shock; with acute or chronic, moderate or severe kidney disease or at risk for impaired kidney function from intravenous dye; and with acute or chronic metabolic acidosis; Risk of lactic acidosis also is increased for people with unstable or acute heart failure, liver disease, or alcoholism, or who are recovering from major surgery; Increased risk of vitamin B12 deficiency; Metallic taste
Alpha-glucosidase inhibitors (acarbose, miglitol, voglibose)	Inhibit carbohydrate digestion in the small intestine by inhibiting enzymes that break down polysaccharides	Slightly lower risk of hypoglycemia compared to sulfonylureas; Associated with modest weight loss; Decreases triglycerides; No detrimental effect on cholesterol	Less effective than most other diabetes pills in lowering glycated hemoglobin; Increased risk of GI side effects than other diabetes pills except metformin; Inconvenient dosing
Thiazolidinediones (Pioglitazone, Rosiglitazone)	Reduce insulin resistance by activating PPAR-γ in fat and muscle	Lower the risk of hypoglycemia; May slightly increase high-density lipoprotein; Rosiglitazone linked to decreased triglycerides; Convenient dosing	Increase the risk of heart failure; Cause an average of 2–5 kg weight gain; Are associated with a higher risk of edema, anemia and bone fractures; Can increase low-density lipoprotein; Rosiglitazone has been linked to increased triglycerides and an increased risk of a heart attack; Pioglitazone has been linked to an increased risk of bladder cancer; Have a slower onset of action; Require monitoring for hepatotoxicity; Expensive
SGLT2 inhibitors

== Generics ==
Many anti-diabetes drugs are available as generics. These include:

- Sulfonylureas – glimepiride, glipizide, glyburide
- Biguanides – metformin
- Thiazolidinediones (Tzd) – pioglitazone, Actos generic
- Alpha-glucosidase inhibitors – Acarbose
- Meglitinides – nateglinide
- Combination of sulfonylureas plus metformin – known by generic names of the two drugs

No generics are available for dipeptidyl peptidase-4 inhibitors (Onglyza), the glifozins, the incretins and various combinations. Sitagliptin patent expired in July 2022, leading to launch of generic sitagliptin brands . This lowered the cost of therapy for type 2 diabetes using sitagliptin .

== Alternative Medicine ==
The effect of Ayurvedic treatments has been researched, however due to methodological flaws of relevant studies and research, it has not been possible to draw conclusions regarding efficacy of these treatments and there is insufficient evidence to recommend them.
