= Cofrogliptin =

Chemical compound

Clinical data
- Other names: HSK7653

Legal status
- Legal status: Investigational

Identifiers
- IUPAC name: (2R,3S,5R,6S)-2-(2,5-Difluorophenyl)-5-(2-methylsulfonyl-4,6-dihydropyrrolo[3,4-c]pyrazol-5-yl)-6-(trifluoromethyl)oxan-3-amine
- CAS Number: 1844874-26-5
- PubChem CID: 118613788
- ChemSpider: 115037226
- UNII: LH4G6K6NKP
- ChEMBL: ChEMBL4646510

Chemical and physical data
- Formula: C_{18}H_{19}F_{5}N_{4}O_{3}S
- Molar mass: 466.43 g·mol^{−1}

Cofrogliptin (developmental name HSK7653) is a long-acting DPP4 inhibitor dosed once every two weeks.
