= Prusogliptin =

Chemical compound

Clinical data
- Other names: DBPR108

Legal status
- Legal status: Investigational

Identifiers
- IUPAC name: (2S,4S)-4-Fluoro-1-[2-[(2-methyl-4-oxo-4-pyrrolidin-1-ylbutan-2-yl)amino]acetyl]pyrrolidine-2-carbonitrile
- CAS Number: 1186426-66-3
- PubChem CID: 44201003
- ChemSpider: 24662486
- UNII: E329HG23ZT
- ChEMBL: ChEMBL1082462

Chemical and physical data
- Formula: C_{16}H_{25}FN_{4}O_{2}
- Molar mass: 324.400 g·mol^{−1}
- 3D model (JSmol): Interactive image
- SMILES: CC(C)(CC(=O)N1CCCC1)NCC(=O)N2C[C@H](C[C@H]2C#N)F
- InChI: InChI=1S/C16H25FN4O2/c1-16(2,8-14(22)20-5-3-4-6-20)19-10-15(23)21-11-12(17)7-13(21)9-18/h12-13,19H,3-8,10-11H2,1-2H3/t12-,13-/m0/s1; Key:VQKSCYBKUIDZEI-STQMWFEESA-N

Prusogliptin (DBPR108) is an experimental DPP-4 inhibitor developed by CSPC Pharmaceutical Group to treat type 2 diabetes.
