= Anagliptin =

Chemical compound

Clinical data
- Trade names: Suiny
- Routes of administration: Oral
- ATC code: none

Legal status
- Legal status: Approved in Japan

Identifiers
- IUPAC name: N-[2-[[2-[(2S)-2-Cyanopyrrolidin-1-yl]-2-oxoethyl]amino]-2-methylpropyl]-2-methylpyrazolo[1,5-a]pyrimidine-6-carboxamide
- CAS Number: 739366-20-2
- ChemSpider: 28492667
- UNII: K726J96838
- CompTox Dashboard (EPA): DTXSID401045689

Chemical and physical data
- Formula: C_{19}H_{25}N_{7}O_{2}
- Molar mass: 383.456 g·mol^{−1}
- 3D model (JSmol): Interactive image
- SMILES: CC1=NN2C=C(C=NC2=C1)C(=O)NCC(C)(C)NCC(=O)N3CCC[C@H]3C#N
- InChI: InChI=1S/C19H25N7O2/c1-13-7-16-21-9-14(11-26(16)24-13)18(28)22-12-19(2,3)23-10-17(27)25-6-4-5-15(25)8-20/h7,9,11,15,23H,4-6,10,12H2,1-3H3,(H,22,28)/t15-/m0/s1; Key:LDXYBEHACFJIEL-HNNXBMFYSA-N

Anagliptin (INN; trade name Suiny) is a pharmaceutical drug for the treatment of type 2 diabetes mellitus. It is approved for use in Japan. It belongs to the class of anti-diabetic drugs known as dipeptidyl peptidase-4 inhibitors or "gliptins".

== Research ==
A systematic review and meta-analysis of anagliptin, published in 2024, found that it is effective in lowering blood glucose in people with type 2 diabetes and that it may lower cholesterol.
