= Gosogliptin =

Chemical compound

Gosogliptin INN: Gosogliptin

Clinical data
- Other names: PF-734200

Identifiers
- IUPAC name: (3,3-Difluoro-1-pyrrolidinyl){(2S,4S)-4-[4-(2-pyrimidinyl)-1-piperazinyl]-2-pyrrolidinyl}methanone
- CAS Number: 869490-23-3
- PubChem CID: 11516136
- DrugBank: DB08382
- ChemSpider: 9690926
- UNII: GI718UO477
- CompTox Dashboard (EPA): DTXSID601007213

Chemical and physical data
- Formula: C_{17}H_{24}F_{2}N_{6}O
- Molar mass: 366.417 g·mol^{−1}
- 3D model (JSmol): Interactive image
- SMILES: c1cnc(nc1)N2CCN(CC2)[C@H]3C[C@H](NC3)C(=O)N4CCC(C4)(F)F
- InChI: InChI=1S/C17H24F2N6O/c18-17(19)2-5-25(12-17)15(26)14-10-13(11-22-14)23-6-8-24(9-7-23)16-20-3-1-4-21-16/h1,3-4,13-14,22H,2,5-12H2/t13-,14-/m0/s1; Key:QWEWGXUTRTXFRF-KBPBESRZSA-N

Gosogliptin (INN; trade name Saterex) is a drug for the treatment of type II diabetes. It is in the class of dipeptidyl peptidase-4 (DPP-4) inhibitors (also called gliptins). It was discovered and developed through Phase 1 and Phase 2 by Pfizer. The crystal structure of DPP-4 in complex with gosogliptin is available. Its metabolism, excretion and pharmacokinetics in rat, dog and human have been described. A cost efficient route has been published. Other studies including Phase 3 studies were conducted in Russia. It is approved for use in Russia.
