= Dipeptidyl peptidase-4 =

Mammalian protein found in humans

DPP4
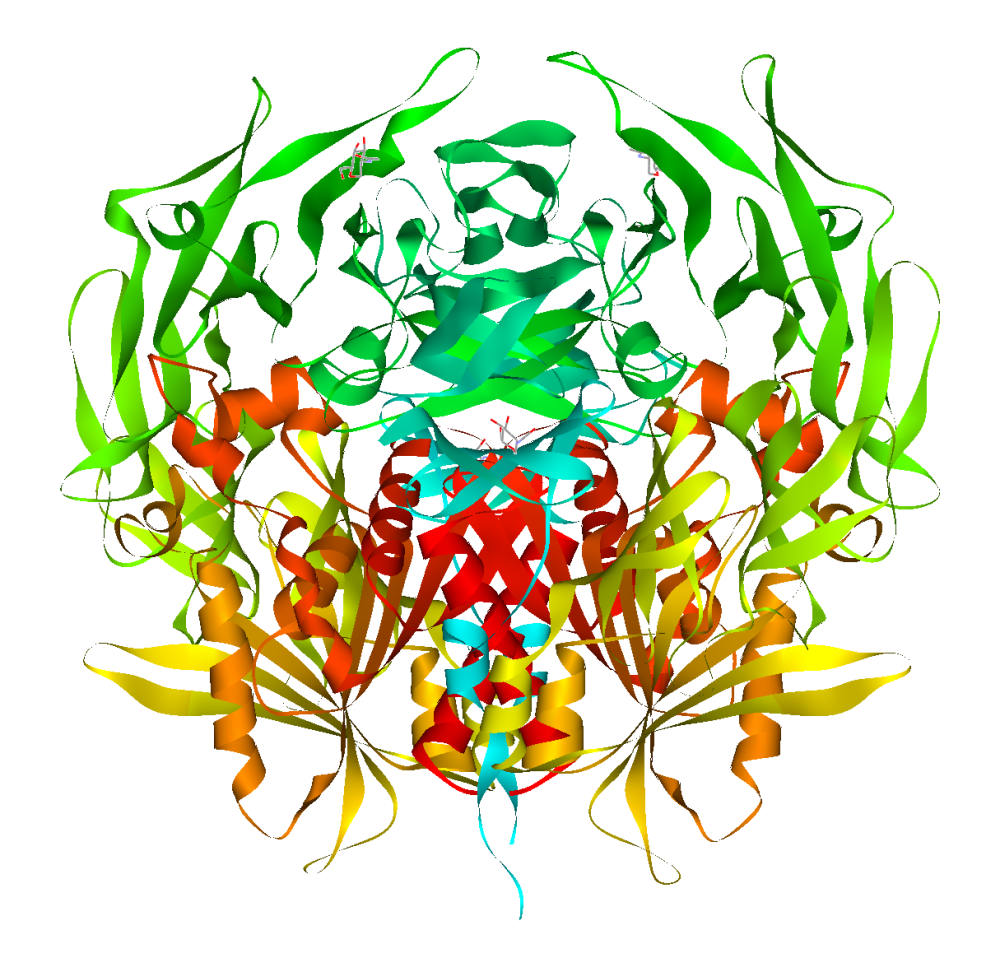

Identifiers
- Aliases: DPP4, ADABP, ADCP2, CD26, DPPIV, TP103, dipeptidyl peptidase 4
- External IDs: OMIM: 102720; MGI: 94919; GeneCards: DPP4
Available structures
PDB	Ortholog search: PDBe RCSB
PDB	List of PDB id codes 1J2E, 1N1M, 1NU6, 1NU8, 1PFQ, 1R9M, 1R9N, 1RWQ, 1TK3, 1TKR, 1U8E, 1W1I, 1WCY, 1X70, 2AJL, 2BGN, 2BGR, 2BUB, 2FJP, 2G5P, 2G5T, 2G63, 2HHA, 2I03, 2I78, 2IIT, 2IIV, 2JID, 2OAG, 2OGZ, 2OLE, 2ONC, 2OPH, 2OQI, 2OQV, 2P8S, 2QJR, 2QKY, 2QOE, 2QT9, 2QTB, 2RGU, 2RIP, 3BJM, 3C43, 3C45, 3CCB, 3CCC, 3D4L, 3EIO, 3F8S, 3G0B, 3G0C, 3G0D, 3G0G, 3H0C, 3HAB, 3HAC, 3KWF, 3KWJ, 3NOX, 3O95, 3O9V, 3OC0, 3OPM, 3Q0T, 3Q8W, 3QBJ, 3SWW, 3SX4, 3VJK, 3VJL, 3VJM, 3W2T, 4A5S, 4DSA, 4DSZ, 4DTC, 4G1F, 4JH0, 4KR0, 4L72, 4LKO, 4J3J, 4N8D, 4N8E, 4PNZ, 4PV7, 4QZV, 3WQH, 5KBY, 5ISM, 5I7U
Enzyme activity
EC #	BRENDA	ExPASy	KEGG	MetaCyc
3.4.14.5	↗	↗	↗	↗

Gene location (Human)
Chr.	Chromosome 2 (human)
Band	2q24.2	Start	161,992,245 bp
Band	2q24.2	End	162,074,215 bp

Gene location (Mouse)
Chr.	Chromosome 2 (mouse)
Band	2 C1.3|2 35.85 cM	Start	62,160,417 bp
Band	2 C1.3|2 35.85 cM	End	62,242,575 bp
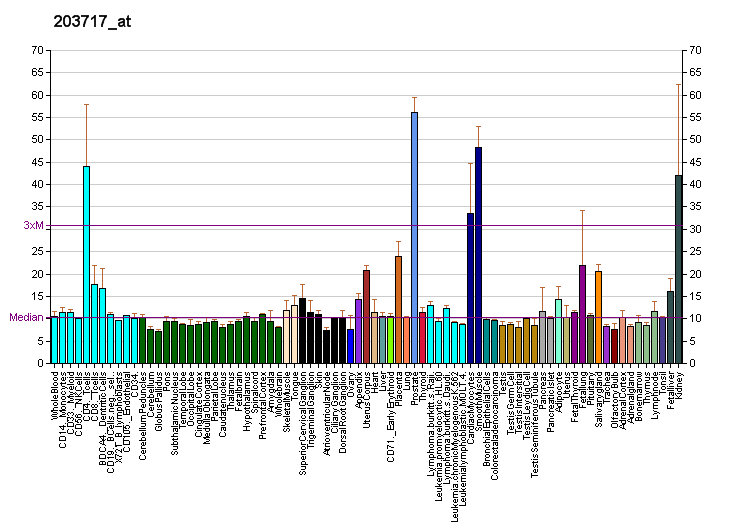

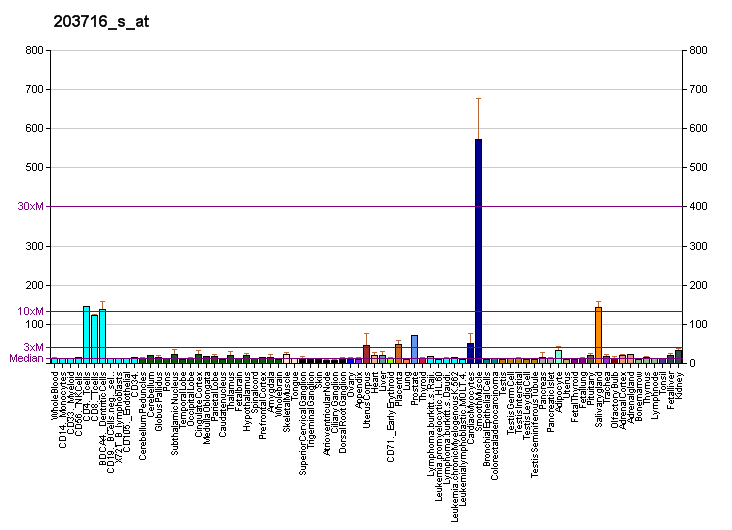

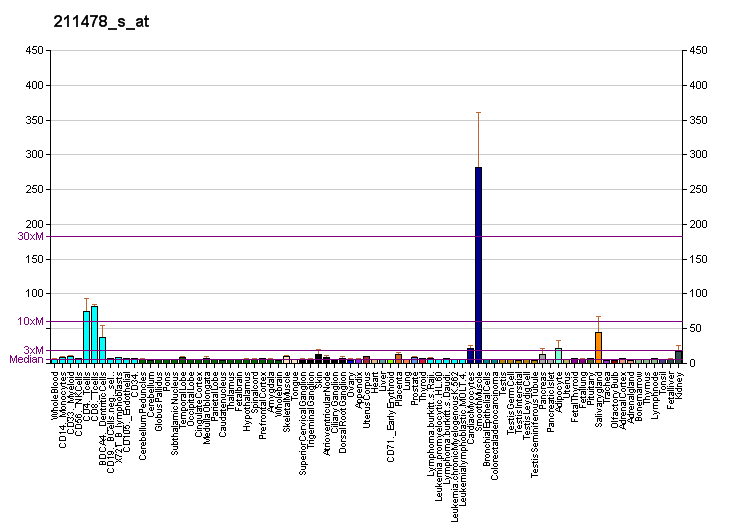
RNA expression pattern
Bgee	Human / Mouse (ortholog); Top expressed in: Achilles tendon; jejunal mucosa; parotid gland; tendon of biceps brachii; duodenum; kidney tubule; placenta; stromal cell of endometrium; parietal pleura; seminal vesicula / Top expressed in: jejunum; vestibular membrane of cochlear duct; seminal vesicula; saccule; ileum; lacrimal gland; parotid gland; left lobe of liver; renal corpuscle; migratory enteric neural crest cell; More reference expression data
BioGPS	More reference expression data
Gene ontology
Molecular function	dipeptidyl-peptidase activity; signaling receptor binding; identical protein binding; peptidase activity; hydrolase activity; virus receptor activity; protein homodimerization activity; serine-type peptidase activity; protease binding; aminopeptidase activity; protein binding; serine-type endopeptidase activity
Cellular component	lamellipodium membrane; extracellular exosome; lysosomal membrane; endocytic vesicle; integral component of membrane; cell projection; cell junction; lamellipodium; apical plasma membrane; membrane; focal adhesion; cell surface; intercellular canaliculus; membrane raft; extracellular region; plasma membrane
Biological process	response to hypoxia; T cell costimulation; psychomotor behavior; behavioral fear response; negative regulation of extracellular matrix disassembly; regulation of cell-cell adhesion mediated by integrin; locomotory exploration behavior; endothelial cell migration; positive regulation of cell population proliferation; T cell activation; cell adhesion; viral entry into host cell; regulation of insulin secretion; proteolysis
Sources:Amigo / QuickGO
Orthologs
Databases	NCBI: entry; OMA: entry
Species	Human	Mouse
Entrez	1803	13482
Ensembl	ENSG00000197635	ENSMUSG00000035000
UniProt	P27487	P28843
RefSeq (mRNA)	NM_001935	NM_001159543; NM_010074
RefSeq (protein)	NP_001926; NP_001366533; NP_001366534; NP_001366535	NP_001153015; NP_034204
Location (UCSC)	Chr 2: 161.99 – 162.07 Mb	Chr 2: 62.16 – 62.24 Mb
PubMed search
- Wikidata
View/Edit Human	View/Edit Mouse

Dipeptidyl peptidase-4 (DPP4 or DPPIV), also known as adenosine deaminase complexing protein 2 or CD26 (cluster of differentiation 26) is a protein that, in humans, is encoded by the DPP4 gene. DPP4 is related to FAP, DPP8, and DPP9. The enzyme was discovered in 1966 by Hopsu-Havu and Glenner, and as a result of various studies on chemism, was called dipeptidyl peptidase IV [DP IV].

== Function ==
The protein encoded by the DPP4 gene is an enzyme expressed on the surface of most cell types and is associated with immune regulation, signal transduction, and apoptosis. It is a type II transmembrane glycoprotein, but a soluble form, which lacks the intracellular and transmembrane part, is present in blood plasma and various body fluids. DPP-4 is a serine exopeptidase that cleaves X-proline or X-alanine dipeptides from the N-terminus of polypeptides. Peptide bonds involving the cyclic amino acid proline cannot be cleaved by the majority of proteases and an N-terminal X-proline "shields" various biopeptides. Extracellular proline-specific proteases therefore play an important role in the regulation of these biopeptides.

DPP-4 is known to cleave a broad range of substrates including growth factors, chemokines, neuropeptides, and vasoactive peptides. The cleaved substrates lose their biological activity in the majority of cases, but in the case of the chemokine RANTES and neuropeptide Y, DPP-4 mediated cleavage leads to a shift in the receptor subtype binding.

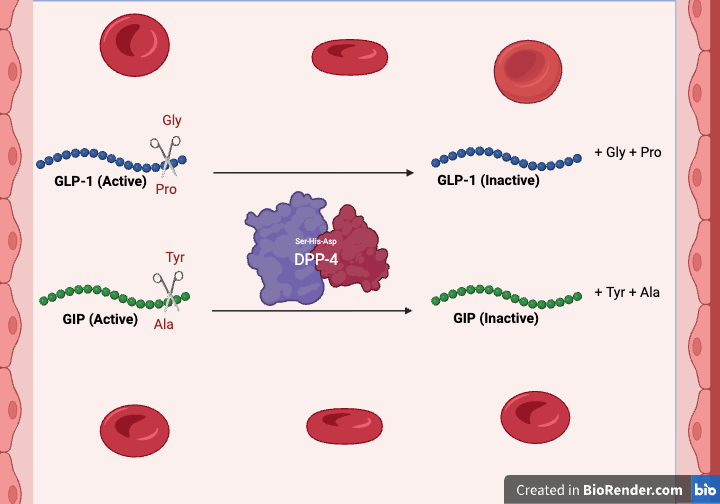
Cleavage of GLP-1 and GIP-1 by DPP-4.For GLP-1, Glycine and Proline are cleaved. For GIP, Tyrosine and Alanine are cleaved.

DPP4 plays a major role in glucose metabolism. It is responsible for the degradation of incretins such as GLP-1. Furthermore, it appears to work as a suppressor in the development of some tumors.

DPP-4 also binds the enzyme adenosine deaminase specifically and with high affinity. The significance of this interaction has yet to be established.

== Animal studies ==
Animal studies suggest its pathogenetic role in development of fibrosis of various organs, such as liver and kidney.

== Clinical significance ==
CD26/DPPIV plays an important role in tumor biology, and is useful as a marker for various cancers, with its levels either on the cell surface or in the serum increased in some neoplasms and decreased in others.

A class of oral hypoglycemics called dipeptidyl peptidase-4 inhibitors works by inhibiting the action of this enzyme, thereby prolonging incretin effect in vivo.

Middle East respiratory syndrome coronavirus has been found to bind to DPP4. It is found on the surface of cells in the airways (such as the lungs) and kidneys. Scientists may be able to use this to their advantage by blocking the virus's entry into the cell.

DPP4, or its Mycobacterial homologue MtDPP, might play a role in the pathogenesis of tuberculosis via cleavage of the chemokine C-X-C motif chemokine ligand 10 (CXCL10).

== See also ==
- Development of dipeptidyl peptidase-4 inhibitors
- Berberine
