= Teneligliptin =

Chemical compound

Clinical data
- Trade names: Tenelia
- ATC code: A10BH08 (WHO)

Legal status
- Legal status: Approved in Japan

Identifiers
- IUPAC name: {(2S,4S)-4-[4-(3-Methyl-1-phenyl-1H-pyrazol-5-yl)-1-piperazinyl]-2-pyrrolidinyl}(1,3-thiazolidin-3-yl)methanone
- CAS Number: 760937-92-6
- PubChem CID: 11949652
- ChemSpider: 10123963
- UNII: 28ZHI4CF9C
- CompTox Dashboard (EPA): DTXSID30997419

Chemical and physical data
- Formula: C_{22}H_{30}N_{6}OS
- Molar mass: 426.58 g·mol^{−1}
- 3D model (JSmol): Interactive image
- SMILES: CC1=NN(C(=C1)N2CCN(CC2)[C@H]3C[C@H](NC3)C(=O)N4CCSC4)C5=CC=CC=C5
- InChI: InChI=1S/C22H30N6OS/c1-17-13-21(28(24-17)18-5-3-2-4-6-18)26-9-7-25(8-10-26)19-14-20(23-15-19)22(29)27-11-12-30-16-27/h2-6,13,19-20,23H,7-12,14-16H2,1H3/t19-,20-/m0/s1; Key:WGRQANOPCQRCME-PMACEKPBSA-N

Teneligliptin (INN; trade name Tenelia) is a pharmaceutical drug for the treatment of type 2 diabetes mellitus. It belongs to the class of anti-diabetic drugs known as dipeptidyl peptidase-4 inhibitors or "gliptins".

== Creation ==
It was created by Mitsubishi Tanabe Pharma and launched in September 2012 by both Mitsubishi Tanabe Pharma and Daiichi Sankyo in Japan.

== Licensing and use ==
=== Japan/Korea/India/Argentina ===
It is approved for use in Japan, Argentina, Korea and India.

== Pharmacology ==
Teneligliptin has unique J-shaped or anchor locked domain structure because of which it has a potent inhibition of DPP 4 enzyme.

Teneligliptin significantly controls glycemic parameters with safety. No dose adjustment is required in renally impaired patients.
