= Vildagliptin =

Chemical compound

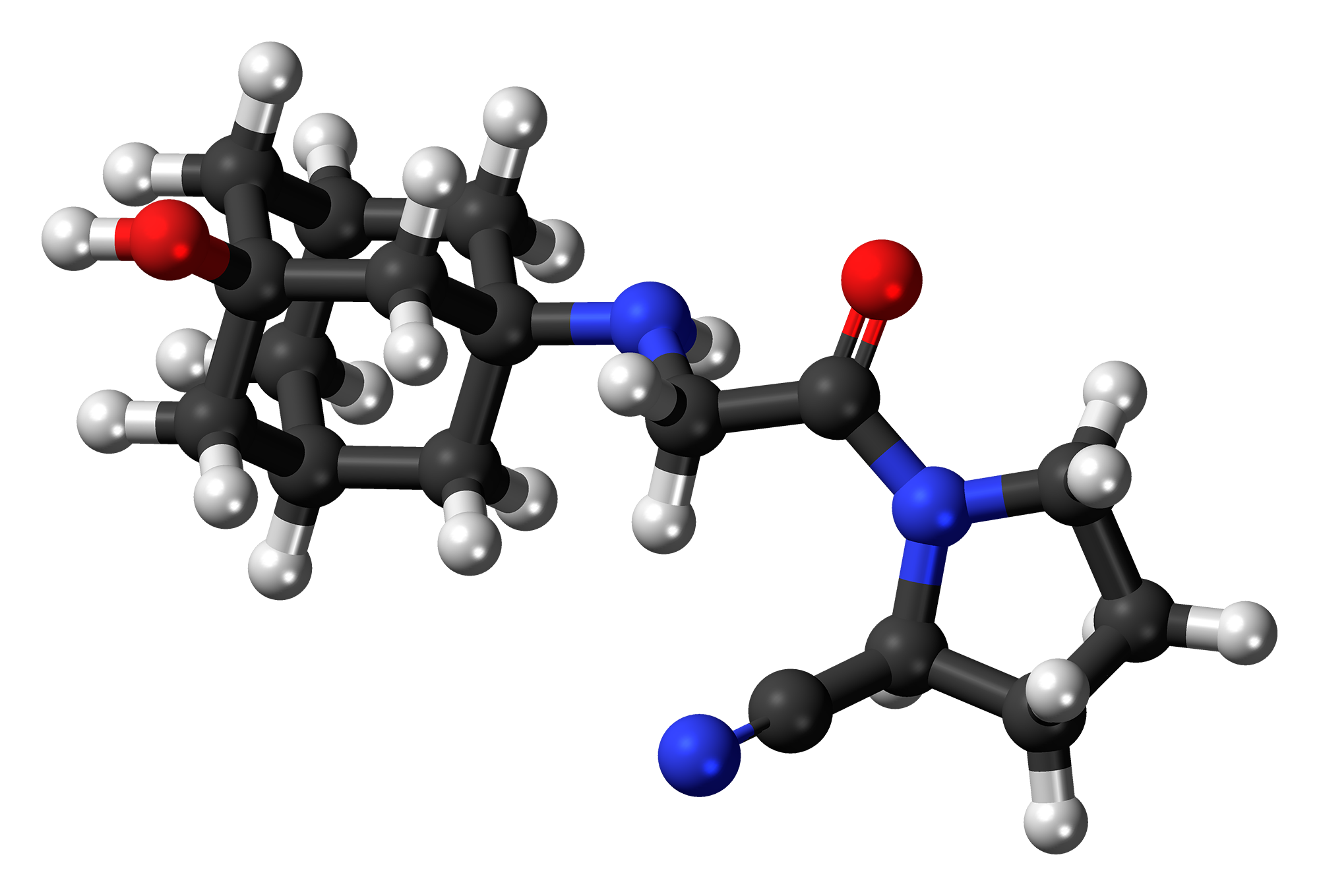

Clinical data
- Trade names: Galvus, others
- Other names: LAF237
- AHFS/Drugs.com: UK Drug Information
- Pregnancy category: Not recommended
- Routes of administration: By mouth
- ATC code: A10BH02 (WHO) ,A10BD08 (WHO) (with metformin)

Legal status
- Legal status: UK: POM (Prescription only); EU: Rx-only; In general: ℞ (Prescription only)

Pharmacokinetic data
- Bioavailability: 85%
- Protein binding: 9.3%
- Metabolism: Mainly hydrolysis to inactive metabolite; CYP450 not appreciably involved
- Elimination half-life: 2 to 3 hours
- Excretion: Kidney

Identifiers
- IUPAC name: (S)-1-[N-(3-Hydroxy-1-adamantyl)glycyl]pyrrolidine-2-carbonitrile
- CAS Number: 274901-16-5
- PubChem CID: 6918537
- IUPHAR/BPS: 6310
- DrugBank: DB04876
- ChemSpider: 5293734
- UNII: I6B4B2U96P
- KEGG: D07080
- ChEMBL: ChEMBL142703
- CompTox Dashboard (EPA): DTXSID80881091
- ECHA InfoCard: 100.158.712

Chemical and physical data
- Formula: C_{17}H_{25}N_{3}O_{2}
- Molar mass: 303.406 g·mol^{−1}
- 3D model (JSmol): Interactive image
- Solubility in water: Freely Soluble in water
- SMILES: N#C[C@H]4N(C(=O)CNC13CC2CC(C1)CC(O)(C2)C3)CCC4
- InChI: InChI=1S/C17H25N3O2/c18-9-14-2-1-3-20(14)15(21)10-19-16-5-12-4-13(6-16)8-17(22,7-12)11-16/h12-14,19,22H,1-8,10-11H2/t12?,13?,14-,16?,17?/m0/s1; Key:SYOKIDBDQMKNDQ-XWTIBIIYSA-N

Vildagliptin, sold under the brand name Galvus among others, is an oral anti-hyperglycemic agent (anti-diabetic drug) of the dipeptidyl peptidase-4 (DPP-4) inhibitor class of drugs. Vildagliptin inhibits the inactivation of GLP-1 and GIP by DPP-4, allowing GLP-1 and GIP to potentiate the secretion of insulin in the beta cells and suppress glucagon release by the alpha cells of the islets of Langerhans in the pancreas.

It was approved by the European Medicines Agency (EMA) in 2007. The European Medicines Agency has also approved a combination of vildagliptin and metformin, vildagliptin/metformin (Eucreas by Novartis) as an oral treatment for type-2 diabetes.

Vildagliptin has been shown to reduce hyperglycemia in type 2 diabetes mellitus.

== Medical uses ==
Vildagliptin is indicated, as an adjunct to diet and exercise, to improve glycemic control in adults with type 2 diabetes as monotherapy in people in whom metformin is inappropriate due to contraindications or intolerance; and in combination with other medicinal products for the treatment of diabetes, including insulin, when these do not provide adequate glycemic control.

== Adverse effects ==
The most common side effects include dizziness.
