= Incretin =

Group of gastrointestinal hormones

GLP-1 and DPP-4 inhibitors

Incretins are a group of peptide metabolic hormones that decrease blood glucose levels. Incretins are released after eating and augment the secretion of insulin released from pancreatic beta cells of the islets of Langerhans by a blood-glucose–dependent mechanism.

Incretins such as GLP-1 inhibit glucagon release from the alpha cells of the islets of Langerhans. In addition, they slow the rate of absorption of nutrients into the bloodstream by reducing gastric emptying and may reduce food intake. The two main peptides that fulfill criteria for an incretin are the intestinal peptide glucagon-like peptide-1 (GLP-1) and gastric inhibitory peptide (GIP, also known as: glucose-dependent insulinotropic polypeptide). GIP is produced and secreted into the blood by K cells located in the mucosa of the upper gastrointestinal tract's duodenum and upper jejunum while GLP1 is produced and secreted into the blood by L cells located in the mucosa of the lower gastrointestinal tracts small and large intestines. Short-chain fatty acids (primarily acetic, propionic, and butyric acids), which microganisms form in the intestines, bind to the FFAR2 and FFAR3 receptors on K cells and L cells to stimulate their respective production and secretion of GIP and GLP-1. Both GLP-1 and GIP are inactivated by the enzyme dipeptidyl peptidase-4 (DPP-4) and are members of the glucagon peptide superfamily.

== Medical uses ==
Medications based on incretins are used in the treatment of type 2 diabetes mellitus as well as the management of obesity.

Most of the earliest incretin-targeting agents to be approved fell into the class of DPP-4 inhibitors; these inhibit DPP-4 and prevent the enzymatic degradation of GLP-1 and GIP. The first medication in this class, sitagliptin, received FDA approval in 2006 for the treatment of type 2 diabetes.

GLP-1 analogs principally act as agonists of the GLP-1 receptor and are thus insulinotropic. Exenatide was the first drug in this class to be used in the treatment of type 2 diabetes; it received FDA approval in 2005. More recently, longer-acting and more potent GLP-1 analogs have been developed, most notably semaglutide, which received FDA approval for type 2 diabetes in 2017. It was subsequently approved for the management of obesity. In 2021, it was in the Top 100 most-prescribed drugs in the United States.

Tirzepatide (sold as Mounjaro and Zepbound) is a potent GIP analog with agonist activity at GIP and GLP-1 receptors. It was approved for the treatment of type 2 diabetes in the United States in May 2022, and for the management of obesity in November 2023.

== Effect ==
The incretin effect describes the phenomenon whereby oral glucose intake elicits a higher insulin response compared to intravenously introduced glucose that produces the same levels of serum glucose levels.

== History ==
In 1932, Belgian physiologist Jean La Barre used the word "incretin" for a gut hormone which stimulates the endocrine pancreas including insulin release. He also proposed that such incretins could be used as a treatment for diabetes mellitus.

== See also ==
- Incretin mimetics
- Secretin family
