= Linagliptin =

Chemical compound

Clinical data
- Pronunciation: /ˌlɪnəˈɡlɪptɪn/ LIN-ə-GLIP-tin
- Trade names: Tradjenta, Trajenta, Trazenta
- Other names: BI-1356
- AHFS/Drugs.com: Monograph
- MedlinePlus: a611036
- License data: US DailyMed: Linagliptin
- Routes of administration: By mouth
- ATC code: A10BH05 (WHO)

Legal status
- Legal status: AU: S4 (Prescription only); CA: ℞-only; UK: POM (Prescription only); US: ℞-only; EU: Rx-only; In general: ℞ (Prescription only)

Pharmacokinetic data
- Bioavailability: ~30% (T_{max} = 1.5 hours)
- Protein binding: 75–99% (concentration-dependent)
- Metabolism: Minimal (~10% metabolized)
- Metabolites: Pharmacologically inactive
- Elimination half-life: ~24 hours
- Excretion: Feces (80%), urine (5%)

Identifiers
- IUPAC name: 8-[(3R)-3-Aminopiperidin-1-yl]-7-(but-2-yn-1-yl)-3-methyl-1-[(4-methylquinazolin-2-yl)methyl]-3,7-dihydro-1H-purine-2,6-dione
- CAS Number: 668270-12-0
- PubChem CID: 10096344
- IUPHAR/BPS: 6318
- DrugBank: DB08882
- ChemSpider: 8271879
- UNII: 3X29ZEJ4R2
- KEGG: D09566
- ChEBI: CHEBI:68610
- ChEMBL: ChEMBL237500
- CompTox Dashboard (EPA): DTXSID201021653

Chemical and physical data
- Formula: C_{25}H_{28}N_{8}O_{2}
- Molar mass: 472.553 g·mol^{−1}
- 3D model (JSmol): Interactive image
- Melting point: 202 °C (396 °F)
- SMILES: CC#CCN1C2=C(N=C1N3CCC[C@H](C3)N)N(C(=O)N(C2=O)CC4=NC5=CC=CC=C5C(=N4)C)C
- InChI: InChI=1S/C25H28N8O2/c1-4-5-13-32-21-22(29-24(32)31-12-8-9-17(26)14-31)30(3)25(35)33(23(21)34)15-20-27-16(2)18-10-6-7-11-19(18)28-20/h6-7,10-11,17H,8-9,12-15,26H2,1-3H3/t17-/m1/s1; Key:LTXREWYXXSTFRX-QGZVFWFLSA-N

Linagliptin, sold under the brand name Tradjenta among others, is a medication used to treat type 2 diabetes (but not type 1) in conjunction with exercise and diet. Linagliptin is a dipeptidyl peptidase-4 inhibitor that works by increasing the production of insulin and decreasing the production of glucagon by the pancreas. It is generally less preferred than metformin and sulfonylureas as an initial treatment. It is taken by mouth.

Common side effects include inflammation of the nose and throat. Serious side effects may include angioedema, pancreatitis, joint pain. Use in pregnancy and breastfeeding is not recommended.

Linagliptin was approved for medical use in the United States, Japan, the European Union, Canada, and Australia in 2011. In 2023, it was the 254th most commonly prescribed medication in the United States, with more than 1 million prescriptions. From August 2021, linagliptin became available as a generic medicine in the US.

== Medical uses ==
Linagliptin is indicated as an adjunct to diet and exercise to improve glycemic control in adults with type 2 diabetes.

== Side effects ==
Linagliptin may cause severe joint pain.

== Mechanism of action ==
Linagliptin belongs to a class of drugs called DPP-4 inhibitors.

== Names ==
Linagliptin is the international nonproprietary name (INN). Brand names: Trajenta, Tradjenta.

== See also ==
- Empagliflozin/linagliptin
