= Dipeptidyl peptidase-4 inhibitor =

Enzyme blocker and diabetes treatment drug

DPP-4 inhibitors and GLP-1

Inhibitors of dipeptidyl peptidase 4 (DPP-4 inhibitors or gliptins) are a class of oral hypoglycemics that block the enzyme dipeptidyl peptidase-4 (DPP-4). They can be used to treat diabetes mellitus type 2.

The first agent of the class—sitagliptin—was approved for marketing by the US Food and Drug Administration (FDA) in 2006.

Glucagon increases blood glucose levels, and DPP-4 inhibitors reduce glucagon and blood glucose levels. The mechanism of DPP-4 inhibitors is to increase incretin levels (GLP-1 and GIP), which inhibit glucagon release, which in turn increases insulin secretion, decreases gastric emptying, and decreases blood glucose levels.

A 2018 meta-analysis found no favorable effect of DPP-4 inhibitors on all-cause mortality, cardiovascular mortality, myocardial infarction or stroke in patients with type 2 diabetes.

== Examples ==
Drugs belonging to this class are:

- Sitagliptin (FDA approved in 2006, and marketed by Merck & Co. as Januvia)
- Vildagliptin (EU approved in 2007, and marketed in the EU by Novartis as Galvus)
- Saxagliptin (FDA approved in 2009, and marketed as Onglyza)
- Linagliptin (FDA approved in 2011, and marketed as Tradjenta by Eli Lilly and Company and Boehringer Ingelheim)
- Gemigliptin (approved in Korea in 2012, and marketed by LG Life Sciences as Zemiglo, among other names)
- Anagliptin (approved in Japan as Suiny in 2012; marketed by Sanwa Kagaku Kenkyusho Co., Ltd. and Kowa Company, Ltd.)
- Teneligliptin (approved in Japan as Tenelia in 2012)
- Alogliptin (FDA approved in 2013 as Nesina/Vipidia, and marketed by Takeda Pharmaceutical Company)
- Trelagliptin (approved for use in Japan as Zafatek/Wedica in 2015)
- Omarigliptin (MK-3102; approved as Marizev in Japan in 2015, having been developed by Merck & Co. In November 2015, Sheu and colleagues showed that omarigliptin could be used once-weekly and was generally well tolerated throughout the base and extension studies)
- Evogliptin (approved as Suganon/Evodine for use in South Korea)
- Gosogliptin (approved as Saterex for use in Russia)
- Dutogliptin (PHX- 1149; free base being developed by Phenomix Corporation. In a phase III trial as of April 2010)
- Neogliptin
- Retagliptin (SP-2086; approved in China)
- Denagliptin
- Cofrogliptin (HSK- 7653; compound 2)
- Fotagliptin
- Prusogliptin
- Cetagliptin (CGT 8012)
- [[Carmegliptin]]
- [[Melogliptin]]
- [[MK-0626]]

Berberine, an alkaloid found in plants of the genus Berberis (the "barberry"), inhibits DPP-4, which may at least partly explains the chemical's antihyperglycemic activity.

== Adverse effects ==
In individuals already taking sulphonylureas, use of DPP-4-class medications concurrently increases their risk for low blood sugar events relative to those on sulphonylureas alone.

Adverse effects include nasopharyngitis, headache, nausea, heart failure, hypersensitivity, and skin reactions.

In late August 2015, the US FDA issued a warning that drugs like sitagliptin, saxagliptin, linagliptin, alogliptin, and other DPP-4 inhibitors could cause joint pain that can be severe and disabling. However, studies assessing risk of rheumatoid arthritis among DPP-4 inhibitor users have been inconclusive. A 2014 review found that the use of saxagliptin and alogliptin increased individuals' risk of developing heart failure, leading the FDA to add warnings to the labels of these drugs in 2016. A 2018 meta-analysis indicated that the use of DPP-4 inhibitors was associated with a 58% increased risk of developing acute pancreatitis compared to placebo or no treatment. Additionally, a 2018 observational study suggested an elevated risk of developing inflammatory bowel disease, specifically ulcerative colitis, which peaked after three to four years of use and decreased after more than four years. Finally, a 2020 Cochrane systematic review found insufficient evidence to suggest that metformin monotherapy reduced all-cause mortality, serious adverse events, cardiovascular mortality, non-fatal myocardial infarction, non-fatal stroke, or end-stage renal disease when compared to DPP-4 inhibitors for the treatment of type 2 diabetes.

=== Cancer ===
In response to a report of precancerous changes in the pancreases of rats and organ donors treated with the DPP-4 inhibitor sitagliptin, the US FDA and the European Medicines Agency each undertook independent reviews of all clinical and preclinical data related to the possible association of DPP-4 inhibitors with pancreatic cancer. In a joint letter to the New England Journal of Medicine, the agencies stated that they had not yet reached a final conclusion regarding a possible causative relationship. A 2014 meta-analysis found no evidence for increased pancreatic cancer risk in people treated with DPP-4 inhibitors, but owing to the modest amount of data available, the authors were unable to completely exclude possibly increased risk.

== Combination drugs ==
Some DPP-4 inhibitor drugs have received approval from the FDA to be used with metformin concomitantly with additive effect to increase the level of glucagon-like peptide 1 (GLP-1) which also decreases hepatic glucose production.

== See also ==
- Development of dipeptidyl peptidase-4 inhibitors
