= DPP =

DPP may stand for:

== Business ==
- Digital Production Partnership, of UK public service broadcasters
- Digital Product Passport, e.g. EU Digital Product Passport
- Direct Participation Program, a financial security
- Discounted payback period, in costing a business investment

== Photography ==
- Digital Photo Professional, Canon software

== Law enforcement ==
- Director of Public Prosecutions, responsible for criminal prosecutions

== Politics ==
- Danish People's Party, a Danish political party
- Democratic Party of the Philippines
- Democratic Progressive Party, a political party of Taiwan
- Democratic Progressive Party (Malawi)
- Democratic Progressive Party (Singapore)
- Democratic Progressive Party of Hong Kong
- Democratic Party for the People, a Japanese political party

== Medicine and science ==
- Decapentaplegic, a morphogen involved in development
- Diketopyrrolopyrrole dye, a class of organic dyes and pigments
- Dipeptidyl peptidases 3-10: DPP3, DPP4, DPP6, DPP7, DPP8, DPP9, DPP10
- Differential Pulse Polarography, a type of electrochemical scan
- Depolarizing prepulse, a type of electrical stimulus

== Entertainment ==
- Pokémon Diamond and Pearl and Pokémon Platinum, the three main titles of the fourth generation of the Pokémon series

== Other ==
- Dark Passion Play
- Department of Plant Protection (Pakistan)
- Prague Public Transit Company

== See also ==
- DP (disambiguation)
- DP2 (disambiguation)
- DDP (disambiguation)
