= Dipeptidyl peptidase =

Enzyme

Dipeptidyl peptidase is a type of enzyme classified under EC 3.4.14.

Types include:

- Cathepsin C, dipeptidyl peptidase-1
- Dipeptidyl-peptidase II
- DPP3, dipeptidyl peptidase-3
- DPP4, Dipeptidyl peptidase-4
- DPP6, dipeptidyl peptidase-6
- DPP7, dipeptidyl peptidase-7
- DPP8, dipeptidyl peptidase-8
- DPP9, dipeptidyl peptidase-9
- DPP10, dipeptidyl peptidase-10

== See also ==
- Tripeptidyl peptidase
