= Tariqilabeo macmahoni =

Conservation status
- Vulnerable (IUCN 3.1)

Scientific classification
- Kingdom: Animalia
- Phylum: Chordata
- Class: Actinopterygii
- Order: Cypriniformes
- Family: Cyprinidae
- Genus: Tariqilabeo
- Species: T. macmahoni

Binomial name
- Tariqilabeo macmahoni (Zugmayer, 1912)

Synonyms
- Labeo mcmahoni Zugmayer, 1912; Gonorhynchus macmahoni (Zugmayer, 1912)

Species of fish

Tariqilabeo macmahoni is a species of freshwater ray-finned fish belonging to the family Cyprinidae, the family which also includes the carps, barbs, minnows and related fishes. This fish is endemic to Pakistan.

== Taxonomy ==
Tariqilabeo macmahoni was first formally described as Labeo macmahoni in 1912 by the Austrian zoologist Erich Zugmayer with its type locality given as Dasht River, near Suntsar and Turbat in Baluchistan Province, Pakistan. In 1990 Muhammad Ramzan Mirza and N. Saboohi proposed the genus Tariqilabeo and designated Labeo macmahoni as its type species. The genus Tariqilabeo is classified in the subfamily Labeoninae within the family Cyprinidae, which is in the order Cypriniformes. This taxon has been regarded as a synonym of T. diplochilus but Eschmeyer's Catalog of Fishes treated it as a valid species.

== Etymology ==
Tariqilabeo macmahoni is the type species of the genus Tariqilabeo, this name suffixes the genus name Labeo, this taxon originally being proposed as a subgenus of that genus, on to the name Tariq, in honour of Zafarullah Khan Tariq who was Deputy Director, Department of Plant Protection, Government of Pakistan, who collected the specimens of this species used by Mizra and Saboohi in their study of this fish. The name of the person Zugmayer honoured with the specific name was not specified but it probably is in honours of the British diplomat and Indian Army officer Arthur Henry McMahon (1862-1949), who asked Zugmayer to set up a collection of marine fishes for a national museum in Quetta.

== Distribution and habitat ==
Tariqilabeo macmahoni is endemic to Pakistan where it is found only in the drainage basin of the Dasht River in Baluchistan. It is found in seasonal waterways, ephemeral pools and ditches where the substrate is stone or clay at altitudes of up to 100 m (330 ft).
