= NLRP1 =

Human protein-coding gene

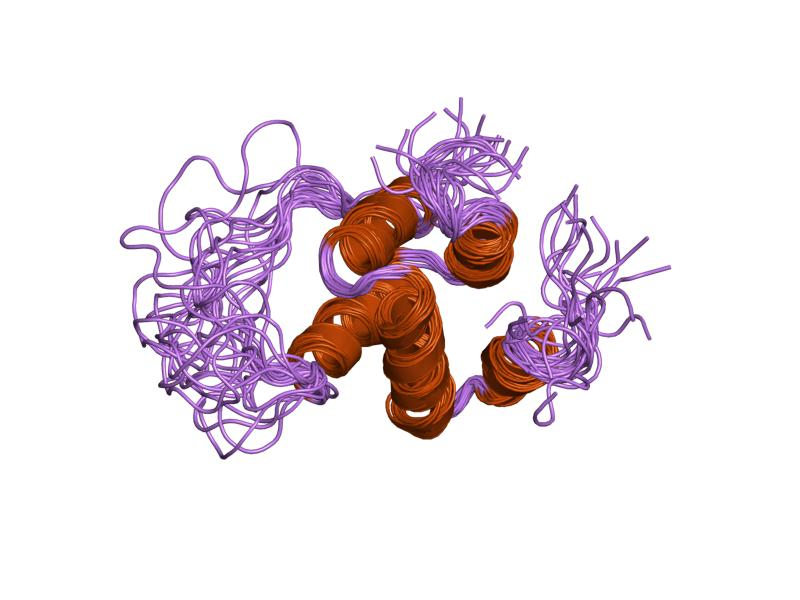

Identifiers
- Aliases: NLRP1, CARD7, CIDED, CLR17.1, DEFCAP, DEFCAP-L/S, NAC, NALP1, PP1044, SLEV1, VAMAS1, NLR family, pyrin domain containing 1, NLR family pyrin domain containing 1, MSPC, AIADK, JRRP
- External IDs: OMIM: 606636; MGI: 3582959; GeneCards: NLRP1
Available structures
PDB	Ortholog search: PDBe RCSB
PDB	List of PDB id codes 1PN5, 3KAT, 4IFP, 4IM6

Gene location (Human)
Chr.	Chromosome 17 (human)
Band	17p13.2	Start	5,499,427 bp
Band	17p13.2	End	5,619,424 bp

Gene location (Mouse)
Chr.	Chromosome 11 (mouse)
Band	11|11 B4	Start	71,043,928 bp
Band	11|11 B4	End	71,121,559 bp
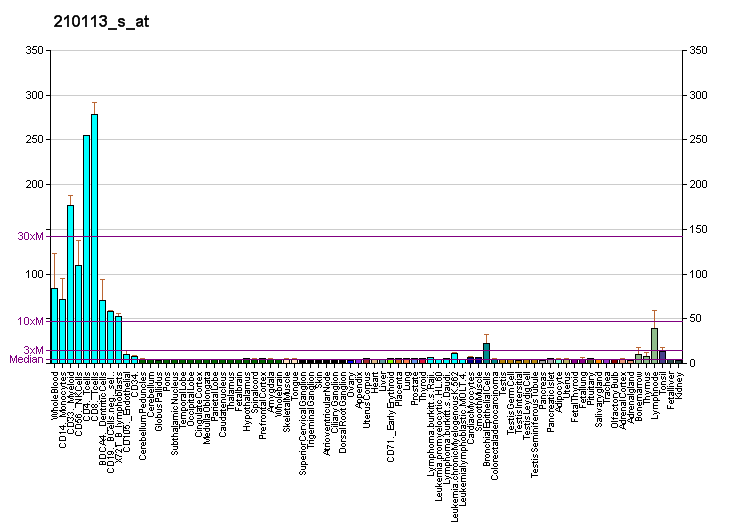

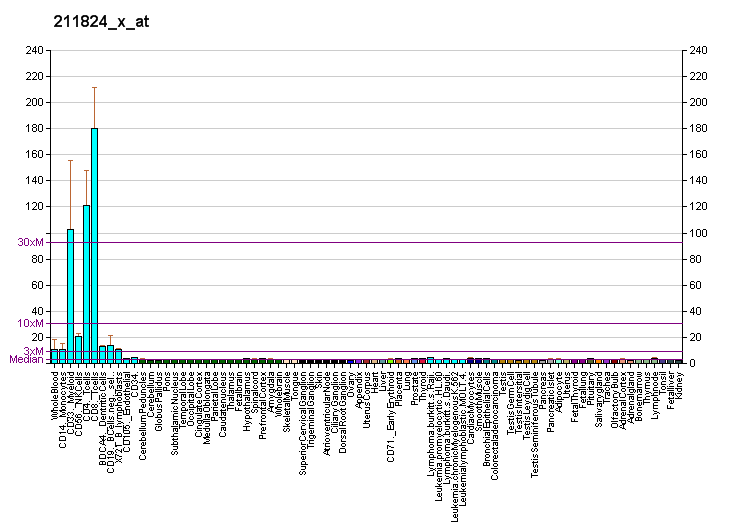

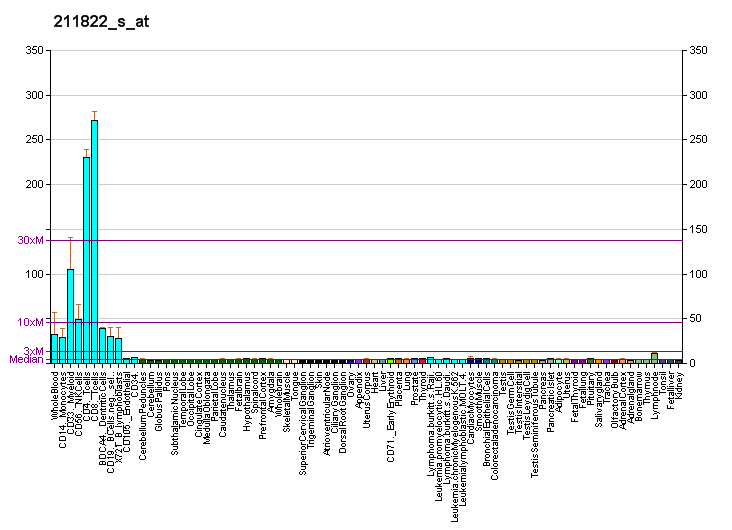
RNA expression pattern
Bgee	Human / Mouse (ortholog); Top expressed in: granulocyte; monocyte; blood; skin of abdomen; spleen; skin of leg; lymph node; right lung; appendix; apex of heart / Top expressed in: jejunum; ileum; colon; duodenum; granulocyte; zone of skin; lip; spleen; ovary; thymus; More reference expression data
BioGPS	More reference expression data
Gene ontology
Molecular function	protein domain specific binding; nucleotide binding; cysteine-type endopeptidase activator activity involved in apoptotic process; ATP binding; enzyme binding; protein binding
Cellular component	cytoplasm; inflammasome complex; nucleus; intracellular anatomical structure; nucleoplasm; cytosol; NLRP1 inflammasome complex
Biological process	neuron apoptotic process; regulation of apoptotic process; activation of cysteine-type endopeptidase activity involved in apoptotic process; response to muramyl dipeptide; apoptotic process; defense response to bacterium; regulation of inflammatory response; immune system process; inflammatory response; innate immune response; viral process; NLRP1 inflammasome complex assembly; positive regulation of cysteine-type endopeptidase activity involved in apoptotic process
Sources:Amigo / QuickGO
Orthologs
Databases	NCBI: entry; OMA: entry
Species	Human	Mouse
Entrez	22861	637515
Ensembl	ENSG00000091592	ENSMUSG00000070390
UniProt	Q9C000	Q2LKV5; Q2LKV2; Q2LKW6; Q0GKD5
RefSeq (mRNA)	NM_033007; NM_001033053; NM_014922; NM_033004; NM_033006	NM_001039680; NM_001040696; NM_001162414
RefSeq (protein)	NP_001028225; NP_055737; NP_127497; NP_127499; NP_127500	NP_001035786; NP_001155886
Location (UCSC)	Chr 17: 5.5 – 5.62 Mb	Chr 11: 71.04 – 71.12 Mb
PubMed search
- Wikidata
View/Edit Human	View/Edit Mouse

NLRP1 encodes NACHT, LRR, FIIND, CARD domain and PYD domains-containing protein 1 in humans. NLRP1 was the first protein shown to form an inflammasome. NLRP1 is expressed by a variety of cell types, which are predominantly epithelial or hematopoietic. The expression is also seen within glandular epithelial structures including the lining of the small intestine, stomach, airway epithelia and in hairless or glabrous skin. NLRP1 polymorphisms are associated with skin extra-intestinal manifestations in CD. Its highest expression was detected in human skin, in psoriasis and in vitiligo. Polymorphisms of NLRP1 were found in lupus erythematosus and diabetes type 1. Variants of mouse NLRP1 were found to be activated upon N-terminal cleavage by the protease in anthrax lethal factor.

== Function ==
This gene encodes a member of the Ced-4 family of apoptosis proteins. Ced-family members contain a caspase recruitment domain (CARD) and are known to be key mediators of programmed cell death. The encoded protein contains a distinct N-terminal pyrin-like motif, which is possibly involved in protein-protein interactions. The NLRP1 protein interacts strongly with caspase 2 and weakly with caspase 9. Overexpression of this gene was demonstrated to induce pyroptosis in cells. Multiple alternatively spliced transcript variants encoding distinct isoforms have been found for this gene, but the biological validity of some variants has not been determined.

== Mechanism of activation ==
NLRP1 activates an antibacterial or antiviral immune response. Antibacterial immune response compensates for the loss of the MAP kinase response. Humans produce NLRP1, but human NLRP1 is not activated by lethal factor. NLRP1 could be activated by proteolytic cleavage, resulting in the removal of an auto-inhibitory PYD and release of the CARD domain, responsible for the recruitment and activation of pro-caspase-1 in the active form of caspase-1. Human NLRP1 activation can be elicited by several means including enteroviral 3C proteases. Its function in immunity is just beginning to be understood.

== Interactions ==
NLRP1 has been shown to interact with caspase 9 and APAF1. Via its FIIND domain, NLRP1 interacts directly with DPP9 and DPP8 which are needed to prevent NLRP1 activation.

Loss of DPP9 in humans and mice, results in NLRP1 activation.

== Variants of NLRP1 in human ==
Several Mendelian diseases caused by NLRP1 germline mutations have been described. These include Multiple Self-healing Palmoplantar Carcinoma, familial Nikam's disease and Autoinflammation with Arthritis and Dyskeratosis. Mutations in NLRP1, whether dominant or recessive, tend to be gain-of-function alleles that trigger inflammasome signaling with IL1B and IL18 release.

== Variants of NLRP1 in mice ==
Mice have three paralogs of the Nlrp1 gene (Nlrp1a, b, c). Nlrp1c is a pseudogene. Mouse NLRP1B is not activated by a receptor-ligand type mechanism. NLRP1B variants from certain inbred mouse strains, BALB/c and 129, can be activated by the lethal factor (LF) protease. The lethal factor protease is produced and secreted by Bacillus anthracis, the agent of anthrax. Together with protective antigen (PA), LF forms a bipartite toxin, Lethal Toxin. The role of PA is to form a translocation channel that delivers LF into the host cell cytosol, where LF play roles in immune response by cleaving and inactivating MAP kinases. LF also directly cleaves NLRP1B proximal to its N-terminus, it is necessary and sufficient for NLRP1B inflammasome formation and CASP1 activation. Activation of NLRP1B-dependent inflammasome responses appears in host defense with mechanism like IL-1β and neutrophils. NLRP1B can function as a sensor of bacterial proteases, immune responses are specifically activated by virulence factors.

It is not clear what stimuli might activate NLRP1A, the other known functional murine NLRP1 paralog. The study identified a mouse carrying a missense gain-of-function mutation in NLRP1A (Q593P) that active inflammasome responses. The mechanism of wild-type NLRP1A activation is unclear.
