= DPPX =

DPPX can relate to

- IBM DPPX, an operating system introduced by IBM, pre-installed on the IBM 8100 and later ported to the IBM ES/9370
- dipeptidyl-peptidase-like protein-6 (DPP6), a protein that is abbreviated either as DPPX or DPP6 (an alternative identifier is VF2)
- dots per pixel (dppx), a unit for measuring pixel density on the web
