= 177 Lu-NNS309 =

Investigational radiopharmaceutical compound

^{177}Lu-NNS309

Clinical data
- Other names: [^{177}Lu]Lu-NNS309
- Routes of administration: Intravenous
- Drug class: Radiation therapy

Legal status
- Legal status: Phase I clinical trials

Pharmacokinetic data
- Elimination half-life: 6.7 days (^{177}Lu component)

Chemical and physical data
- 3D model (JSmol): Interactive image
- SMILES: CCCCCC[C@H]1C(=O)N[C@H](C(=O)NCC(=O)N[C@H](C(=O)N[C@H](C(=O)N2CCC[C@@H]2C(=O)NCC(=O)NCC(=O)N([C@H](C(=O)N[C@H](C(=O)N1)CC3=CC=C(C=C3)CNC(=O)COCCOCCNC(=O)CN4CCN(CCN(CCN(CC4)CC(=O)O)CC(=O)O)CC(=O)O)CC5=CC=CC=C5)C)CC(=O)O)CCCCNC(=O)N6CCN(CC6)CC(=O)O)CC7=CNC8=CC=CC=C87.[^{177}Lu]
- InChI: InChI=InChI=1S/C89H128N20O25.Lu/c1-3-4-5-9-19-66-84(127)99-68(46-62-49-92-64-18-11-10-17-63(62)64)82(125)95-51-73(111)97-65(20-12-13-26-91-89(132)108-39-37-107(38-40-108)57-81(123)124)83(126)101-69(47-77(115)116)88(131)109-28-14-21-70(109)86(129)96-50-72(110)94-52-76(114)102(2)71(45-59-15-7-6-8-16-59)87(130)100-67(85(128)98-66)44-60-22-24-61(25-23-60)48-93-75(113)58-134-43-42-133-41-27-90-74(112)53-103-29-31-104(54-78(117)118)33-35-106(56-80(121)122)36-34-105(32-30-103)55-79(119)120;/h6-8,10-11,15-18,22-25,49,65-71,92H,3-5,9,12-14,19-21,26-48,50-58H2,1-2H3,(H,90,112)(H,91,132)(H,93,113)(H,94,110)(H,95,125)(H,96,129)(H,97,111)(H,98,128)(H,99,127)(H,100,130)(H,101,126)(H,115,116)(H,117,118)(H,119,120)(H,121,122)(H,123,124);/t65-,66-,67-,68-,69-,70+,71-;/m0./s1/i;1+2; Key:NIMFRTFOYUYZQS-JXPRPOKFSA-N

^{177}Lu-NNS309 is an investigational radiopharmaceutical compound currently under development by Novartis Pharmaceuticals for the treatment of various solid tumors. The compound is being evaluated in Phase I clinical trials for patients with pancreatic, lung, breast, and colorectal cancers.

== Chemical composition ==
^{177}Lu-NNS309 is a radiopharmaceutical that combines the radioactive isotope lutetium-177 (^{177}Lu) with the targeting compound NNS309. Lutetium-177 has been widely discussed as a radioisotope of choice for targeted radionuclide therapy, featuring simultaneous emission of imageable gamma photons [208 keV (11%) and 113 keV (6.4%)] along with particulate β^{−} emission [β(max) = 497 keV], making it a theranostically desirable radioisotope. The radionuclide has a moderate beta energy similar to 131I and possesses a 6.7-day half-life.

== Mechanism of action ==
The therapeutic mechanism of ^{177}Lu-NNS309 relies on targeted radionuclide therapy principles.

NNS309 contains a nonapeptide that targets fibroblast activation protein, alpha (FAP-alpha). FAP is a transmembrane glycoprotein expressed on the surface of cancer-associated fibroblasts (CAFs) in the tumor microenvironment. The nonapeptide is covalently linked to the metal chelating agent DOTA which binds ^{177}Lu^{3+}.

The average path length of ^{177}Lu particles in soft tissue is 670 μm, making this radionuclide ideal for delivering energy to small volumes, including micrometastatic disease, and tumor cells near the surface of cavities. ^{177}Lu is a radioisotope that is increasingly explored as a therapeutic agent for treating various conditions, including neuroendocrine tumors and metastatic prostate cancer.

== Clinical development ==
=== Phase I trials ===
A Phase I open-label, multi-center study is currently evaluating the safety, tolerability, dosimetry, and preliminary activity of [^{177}Lu]Lu-NNS309 in patients with pancreatic, lung, breast and colorectal cancers. The compound is being developed by Novartis Pharmaceuticals Corp. and has reached Phase 1 clinical trials status globally.

== Related compounds ==
A diagnostic companion compound, [68Ga]Ga-NNS309, is also under development using gallium-68 instead of lutetium-177. This gallium-68 labeled version is being developed by Novartis Pharmaceuticals Corp. and has reached Phase 1 clinical trials for similar therapeutic areas including neoplasms, nervous system diseases, and various other conditions.

== See also ==
- Lutetium-177
- Radiopharmaceutical
- Theranostics
