= Tripeptidyl peptidase =

Class of enzymes

A tripeptidyl peptidase is a type of enzyme.

Types include:

- Tripeptidyl peptidase I
- Tripeptidyl peptidase II

== See also ==
- Dipeptidyl peptidase
