= DDP =

DDP may refer to:

== Commerce ==
- Delivered Duty Paid, an international shipping method
- Devil's Due Publishing, a comic book publisher
- Disability and Development Partners, a UK international organisation
- Double Dragon Publishing, a science-fiction and fantasy publisher

== Computing ==
- Datagram Delivery Protocol, a networking protocol in the AppleTalk suite
- DDP-316, family of minicomputer systems, including DDP-116, DDP-516, DDP-716.
- Differential dynamic programming, a second-order algorithm for trajectory optimization
- Digital Data Pack, cassette tape data storage format of the Coleco Adam
- Disc Description Protocol, a generic disc image file format
- Distributed Data Processing, a 1970s term referring to one of IBM's combined offerings
- Distributed Data Protocol, a client-server protocol for querying and updating a database
- Dolby Digital Plus, a multichannel audio compression technology

== Medicine and science ==
- Deafness dystonia polypeptide, a protein/gene also known as TIMM8A
- DNA Doe Project, a non-profit, volunteer group that identifies John and Jane Does using genetic genealogy techniques
- Dyadic developmental psychotherapy, for children with serious emotional disorders

== Politics and government ==
- Deutsche Demokratische Partei (German Democratic Party), a 1918–1930 political party in the German Weimar Republic
- Deputy Director for Plans, former name of the Deputy Director of CIA for Operations
- Direct Democracy Party of New Zealand, a 2005–2009 political party
- Doordarshi Party, a 1980–1997 Indian political party

== Other uses ==
- Diamond Dallas Page, a professional wrestler
- Disney Dining Plan, a meal package for Walt Disney World hotel guests
- Doctors for Disaster Preparedness, a non-profit organization on fringe-science topics, mainly advocating global warming denial
- DoDonPachi, a 1997 video game
- Dominicans Don't Play, a New York-based street gang of Latino youths whose heritage is traced to the Dominican Republic
- Dongdaemun Design Plaza, a Seoul landmark
- Dricus du Plessis, a South African professional mixed martial artist
- Dublin Death Patrol, an American thrash metal band
- Dudley Port railway station (station code), in Tipton, England, United Kingdom
