= Tripeptidyl-peptidase =

Tripeptidyl-peptidase may refer to the following:

- Tripeptidyl-peptidase I, an enzyme
- Tripeptidyl-peptidase II, an enzyme
