= Fibroblast activation protein, alpha =

Enzyme in humans

FAP
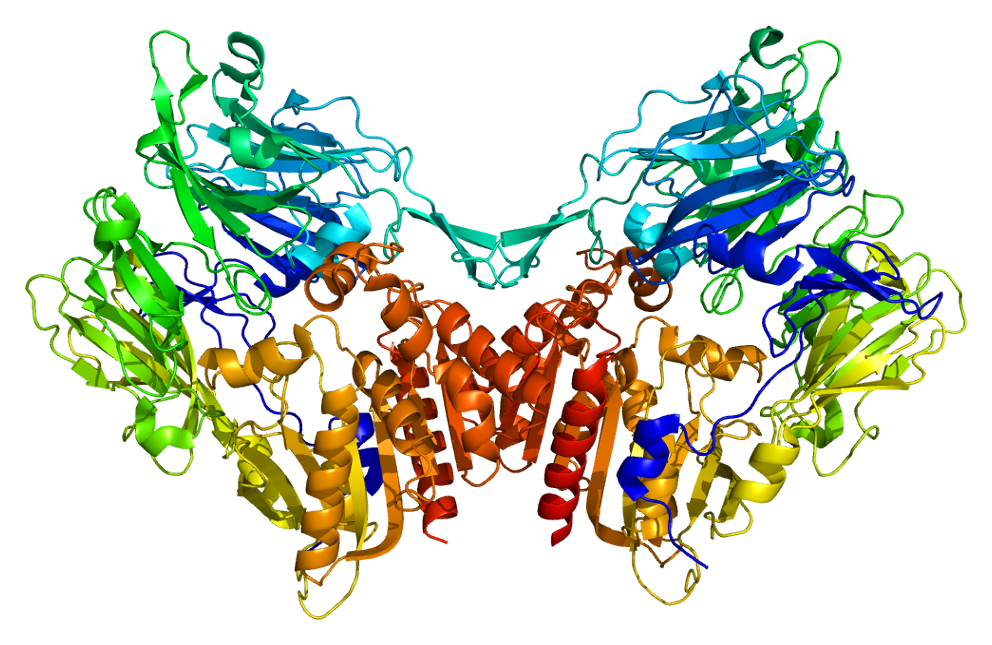

Identifiers
- Aliases: FAP, DPPIV, FAPA, SIMP, fibroblast activation protein alpha, FAPalpha
- External IDs: OMIM: 600403; MGI: 109608; GeneCards: FAP
Available structures
PDB	Ortholog search: PDBe RCSB
PDB	List of PDB id codes 1Z68
Enzyme activity
EC #	BRENDA	ExPASy	KEGG	MetaCyc
3.4.14.5	↗	↗	↗	↗
3.4.21.26	↗	↗	↗	↗

Gene location (Human)
Chr.	Chromosome 2 (human)
Band	2q24.2	Start	162,170,684 bp
Band	2q24.2	End	162,245,151 bp

Gene location (Mouse)
Chr.	Chromosome 2 (mouse)
Band	2 C1.3|2 35.85 cM	Start	62,331,287 bp
Band	2 C1.3|2 35.85 cM	End	62,404,419 bp
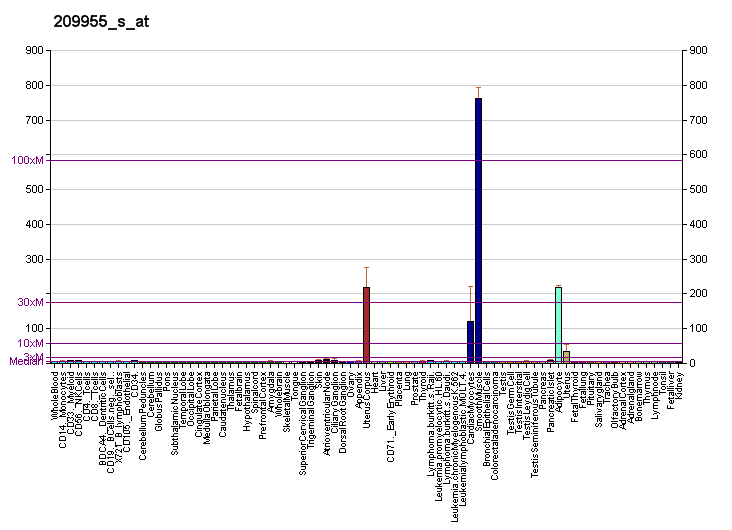
RNA expression pattern
Bgee	Human / Mouse (ortholog); Top expressed in: stromal cell of endometrium; islet of Langerhans; body of uterus; smooth muscle tissue; cartilage tissue; gallbladder; decidua; Descending thoracic aorta; myometrium; tendon of biceps brachii / Top expressed in: body of femur; vestibular membrane of cochlear duct; retinal pigment epithelium; internal carotid artery; external carotid artery; Epithelium of choroid plexus; tibiofemoral joint; squamous epithelium; mesothelium; ankle; More reference expression data
BioGPS	More reference expression data
Gene ontology
Molecular function	protein dimerization activity; protein homodimerization activity; endopeptidase activity; protease binding; integrin binding; peptidase activity; protein binding; serine-type peptidase activity; metalloendopeptidase activity; serine-type endopeptidase activity; hydrolase activity; dipeptidyl-peptidase activity
Cellular component	cytoplasm; integral component of membrane; cell projection; membrane; focal adhesion; basal part of cell; plasma membrane; apical part of cell; ruffle membrane; extracellular region; cell surface; cell junction; lamellipodium membrane; lamellipodium; extracellular space
Biological process	positive regulation of execution phase of apoptosis; regulation of collagen catabolic process; melanocyte apoptotic process; negative regulation of extracellular matrix disassembly; negative regulation of extracellular matrix organization; proteolysis; cell adhesion; negative regulation of cell proliferation involved in contact inhibition; angiogenesis; melanocyte proliferation; proteolysis involved in cellular protein catabolic process; regulation of fibrinolysis; endothelial cell migration; apoptotic process
Sources:Amigo / QuickGO
Orthologs
Databases	NCBI: entry; OMA: entry
Species	Human	Mouse
Entrez	2191	14089
Ensembl	ENSG00000078098	ENSMUSG00000000392
UniProt	Q12884	P97321
RefSeq (mRNA)	NM_001291807; NM_004460	NM_007986
RefSeq (protein)	NP_001278736; NP_004451	NP_032012
Location (UCSC)	Chr 2: 162.17 – 162.25 Mb	Chr 2: 62.33 – 62.4 Mb
PubMed search
- Wikidata
View/Edit Human	View/Edit Mouse

Fibroblast activation protein alpha (FAP-alpha) also known as prolyl endopeptidase FAP is an enzyme that in humans is encoded by the FAP gene.

Prolyl endopeptidase FAP is a 170 kDa membrane-bound gelatinase. It was independently identified as a surface glycoprotein recognized by the F19 monoclonal antibody in activated fibroblasts and a Surface Expressed Protease (seprase) in invasive melanoma cells.

== Structure and enzymatic activity ==
FAP is a 760 amino acid long type II transmembrane glycoprotein. It contains a very short cytoplasmic N terminal part (6 amino acids), a transmembrane region (amino acids 7–26), and a large extracellular part with an alpha/beta-hydrolase domain and an eight-bladed beta-propeller domain.

A soluble form of FAP, which lacks the intracellular and transmembrane part, is present in blood plasma. FAP is a non-classical serine protease, which belongs to the S9B prolyl oligopeptidase subfamily. Other members of the S9B subfamily are DPPIV, DPP8 and DPP9. FAP is most closely related to DPPIV (approximately 50% of their amino acids are identical). The active site of FAP is localized in the extracellular part of the protein and contains a catalytic triad composed of Ser^{624} Asp^{702} His^{734} in humans and mice. FAP is catalytically active as a 170kD homodimer and has a dipeptidase and an endopeptidase activity.

Several bioactive peptides and structural proteins were reported to be cleaved by FAP, such as neuropeptide Y (NPY), Peptide YY, Substance P (SP), and B-type natriuretic peptide (BNP), human fibroblast growth factor 21 (FGF-21), human alpha2 antiplasmin and denatured collagen I and III. NPY, FGF-21 and alpha2 antiplasmin are considered to be physiological FAP substrates.

== Expression and possible function ==
FAP expression under physiological conditions is very low in the majority of adult tissues. FAP is nevertheless expressed during embryonic development, and in adults in pancreatic alpha cells in multipotent bone marrow stromal cells (BM-MSC) and uterine stroma.

FAP expression is high in reactive stromal fibroblasts of epithelial cancers, granulation tissue of healing wounds, and malignant cells of bone and soft tissue sarcomas. FAP is thought to be involved in the control of fibroblast growth or epithelial-mesenchymal interactions during development, tissue repair, and epithelial carcinogenesis. Fibroblast activation protein (FAP) is overexpressed in a vast majority of neoplasms, particularly in more than 90% of epithelial tumors which could be an appropriate target for evaluation of tumor’s molecular and metabolic functions by FAP inhibitor (FAPI) ligands

== Clinical significance ==
FAP expression is seen on activated stromal fibroblasts of more than 90% of all human carcinomas. Stromal fibroblasts play an important role in the development, growth and metastasis of carcinomas. Several approaches to FAP targeting in cancer diagnosis and treatment are currently being tested. In diagnostic imaging radiolabeled FAP inhibitors (FAPIs) are used as PET tracers to visualize tumors. Therapeutic approaches include the use of low molecular weight inhibitors, prodrugs activated by FAP, various anti-FAP antibodies and their conjugates, FAP-CAR T cells, and FAP vaccines.

By cleaving FGF-21, FAP is also thought to play a possible role in energy metabolism.

Talabostat is an inhibitor of FAP and related enzymes, for which clinical trials have been done, but further research is suspended.

Sibrotuzumab is a monoclonal antibody against FAP.
