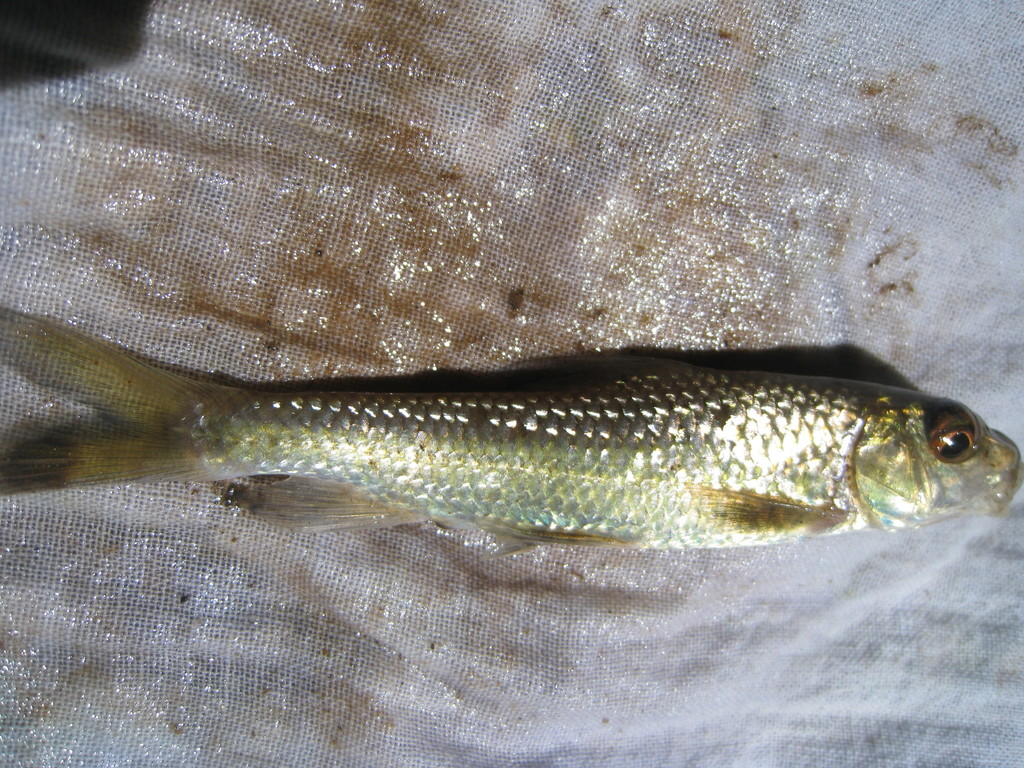
- Tariqilabeo periyarensis

Scientific classification
- Kingdom: Animalia
- Phylum: Chordata
- Class: Actinopterygii
- Order: Cypriniformes
- Family: Cyprinidae
- Subfamily: Labeoninae
- Genus: Tariqilabeo; Mirza & N. Saboohi, 1990

Type species
- Labeo macmahoni Zugmayer, 1912

Synonyms
- Akrokolioplax Zhang & Kottelat, 2006; Gonorhynchus McClelland, 1838

= Tariqilabeo =

Genus of fishes

Tariqilabeo is a genus of fish in the family Cyprinidae native to Asia.

== Species ==
These are the currently recognized species in this genus:

- Tariqilabeo adiscus (Annandale, 1919)
- Tariqilabeo bicornis (H. W. Wu, 1977)
- Tariqilabeo burmanicus (Hora, 1936)
- Tariqilabeo diplochilus (Heckel, 1838)
- Tariqilabeo iranicus Esmaeili, Sayyadzadeh, Masoumi, Hashemi & Echreshavi, 2025
- Tariqilabeo latius (Hamilton, 1822)
- Tariqilabeo macmahoni (Zugmayer, 1912)
- Tariqilabeo periyarensis (A. G. K. Menon & Jacob, 1996)
- Tariqilabeo wattanah (Sykes, 1839)
