= Tariqilabeo bicornis =

Conservation status
- Data Deficient (IUCN 3.1)

Scientific classification
- Kingdom: Animalia
- Phylum: Chordata
- Class: Actinopterygii
- Order: Cypriniformes
- Family: Cyprinidae
- Subfamily: Labeoninae
- Genus: Tariqilabeo
- Species: T. bicornis

Binomial name
- Tariqilabeo bicornis (H. W. Wu, 1977)

Synonyms
- Akrokolioplax bicornis (Wu, 1977); Epalzeorhynchos bicornis Wu, 1977; Gonorhynchus bicornis (Wu, 1977)

Species of fish

Tariqilabeo bicornis, the bihorned barbel, is a species of fish in the family Cyprinidae. This fish reaches up to 15 or 16 centimeters in length. It is found in the upper Salween River in Yunnan, Thailand and Myanmar.
