= DP2 =

DP2 may refer to:

- British Rail DP2 a test locomotive built by English Electric
- Sigma DP2, a photographic camera
- Prostaglandin DP2 receptor
- Dance Praise 2: The ReMix, a 2007 video game
- Deadly Premonition 2: A Blessing in Disguise, a 2020 video game
- Deadpool 2, a 2018 film
- Dynamic positioning Class 2, a computer-controlled maritime navigation system

== See also ==
- The dictionary definition of DPDP at Wiktionary
- DP (disambiguation)
- DPP (disambiguation)
