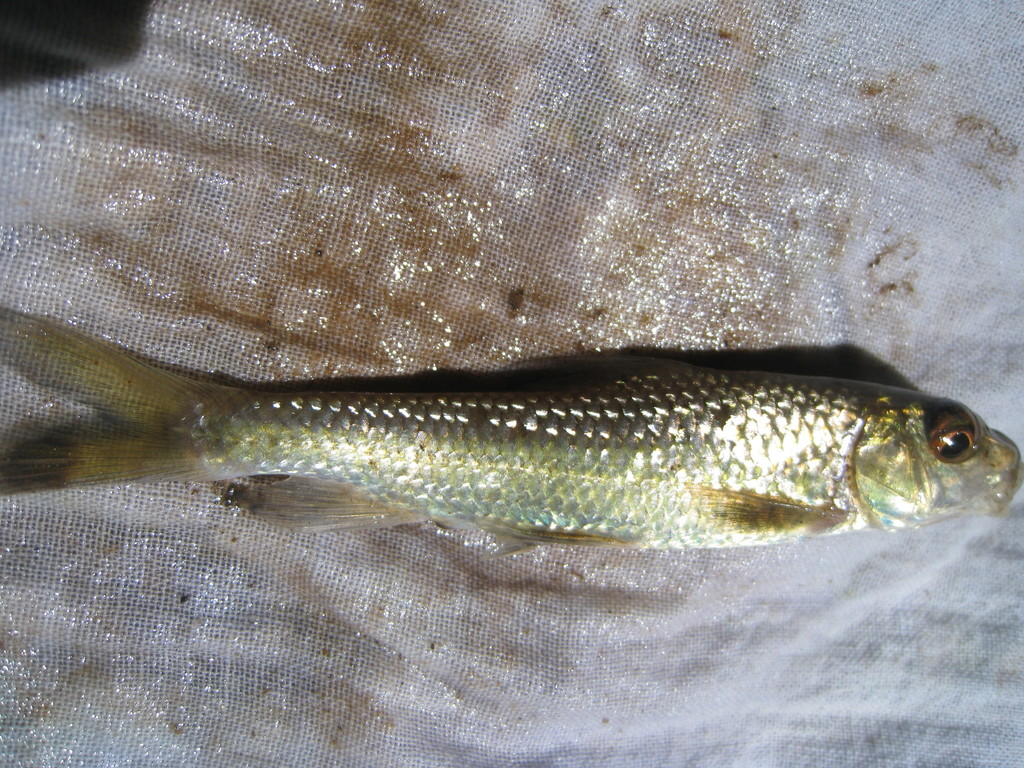

Conservation status
- Endangered (IUCN 3.1)

Scientific classification
- Kingdom: Animalia
- Phylum: Chordata
- Class: Actinopterygii
- Order: Cypriniformes
- Family: Cyprinidae
- Genus: Tariqilabeo
- Species: T. periyarensis

Binomial name
- Tariqilabeo periyarensis Menon & P. C. Jacob, 1996

Synonyms
- Crossocheilus periyarensis (Menon & Jacob, 1996)

= Tariqilabeo periyarensis =

Species of fish

Tariqilabeo periyarensis is a species of fish in the family Cyprinidae. This species is only found in Periyar River in Kerala, India.
