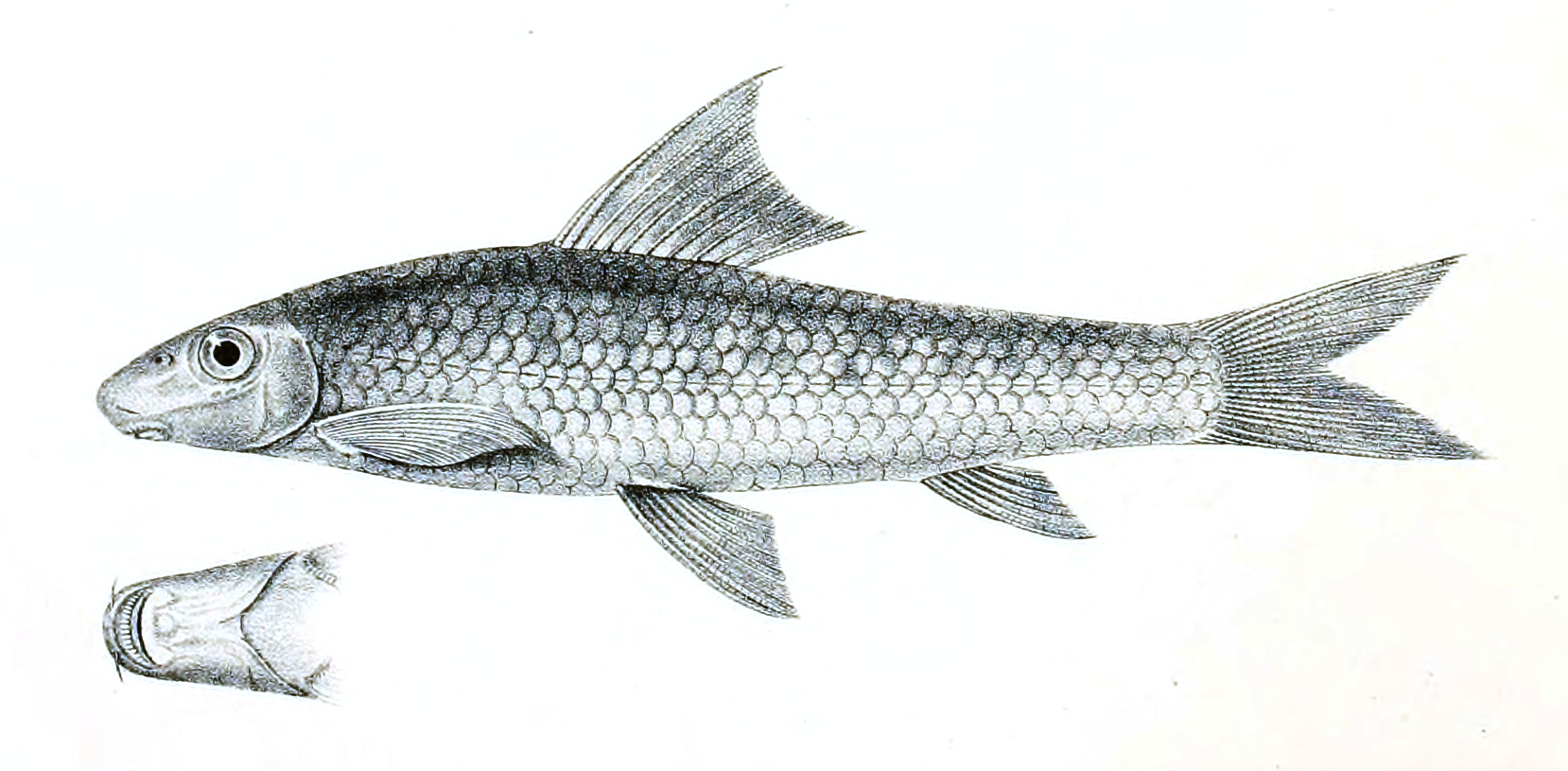

Conservation status
- Least Concern (IUCN 3.1)

Scientific classification
- Kingdom: Animalia
- Phylum: Chordata
- Class: Actinopterygii
- Order: Cypriniformes
- Family: Cyprinidae
- Genus: Tariqilabeo
- Species: T. latius

Binomial name
- Tariqilabeo latius (Hamilton, 1822)

Synonyms
- Chondrostoma wattanah Sykes, 1839; Cirrhina latia (Hamilton, 1822); Crossocheilus gohama (Hamilton, 1822); Crossocheilus latius (Hamilton, 1822); Crossocheilus latius latius (Hamilton, 1822); Crossocheilus latius punjabensis Mukerji, 1934; Crossocheilus sada (Hamilton, 1822); Cyprinus gohama Hamilton, 1822; Cyprinus latius Hamilton, 1822; Cyprinus sada Hamilton, 1822; Gonorhynchus brevis McClelland, 1839; Gonorhynchus fimbriatus McClelland, 1839; Gonorhynchus macrosomus McClelland, 1839

= Tariqilabeo latius =

Species of fish

Tariqilabeo latius, also known as the stone roller or Gangetic latia, is a species of ray-finned fish in the genus Tariqilabeo. It is found in India, Bangladesh, Myanmar, Nepal, and China.
