= Tariqilabeo burmanicus =

Conservation status
- Least Concern (IUCN 3.1)

Scientific classification
- Kingdom: Animalia
- Phylum: Chordata
- Class: Actinopterygii
- Order: Cypriniformes
- Family: Cyprinidae
- Genus: Tariqilabeo
- Species: T. burmanicus

Binomial name
- Tariqilabeo burmanicus (Hora, 1936)

Synonyms
- Crossocheilus burmanicus Hora, 1936; Crossocheilus multirastellus Su, Yang & Chen, 2000; Crossochilus latius subsp. burmanicus Hora, 1936

Species of fish

Tariqilabeo burmanicus, the Burmese latia, is a tropical freshwater species of fish in the family Cyprinidae, that is closely related to minnows and carps. It lives in the streams and rivers of mountains that are located in the Indian subcontinent, specifically India (Manipur) and Myanmar.
