= Tariqilabeo wattanah =

Scientific classification
- Kingdom: Animalia
- Phylum: Chordata
- Class: Actinopterygii
- Order: Cypriniformes
- Family: Cyprinidae
- Genus: Tariqilabeo
- Species: T. wattanah

Binomial name
- Tariqilabeo wattanah (Sykes, 1839

Synonyms
- Chondrostoma wattanah Sykes, 1839; Gonorhynchus wattanah (Sykes 1839)

Species of fish

Tariqilabeo wattanah, the Deccan latia, is a species of freshwater ray-finned fish belonging to the family Cyprinidae, the family which also includes the carps, barbs, minnows and related fishes. This fish is endemic to India, where it occurs in the Bhima and Godavari Rivers.
