= TRIANGLE disease =

- Other names: TPPII-related immunodeficiency, autoimmunity, and neurodevelopmental delay with impaired glycolysis and lysosomal expansion disease
- TRIANGLE disease has an autosomal recessive pattern of inheritance
- Frequency: 0.0001%

TRIANGLE disease is a rare genetic disorder of the immune system. TRIANGLE stands for "TPPII-related immunodeficiency, autoimmunity, and neurodevelopmental delay with impaired glycolysis and lysosomal expansion" where TPP2 is the causative gene. This disease manifests as recurrent infection, autoimmunity, and neurodevelopmental delay. TRIANGLE disease was first described in a collaborative study by Dr. Helen C. Su from the National Institute of Allergy and Infectious Diseases, National Institutes of Health, and Dr. Sophie Hambleton from the University of Newcastle and their collaborators in 2014. The disease was also described by the group of Ehl et al.

== Genetics ==
TRIANGLE disease is caused by loss-of-function mutations in the gene TPP2, which stands for tripeptidyl peptidase II. TPP2 maps to human chromosome 13q32-q33, has 32 exons, and encodes for a 1249 amino acid protein. The genetic model for this disease is loss-of-function. This means that for people with TRIANGLE disease, the gene TPP2 is unable to produce protein or produce functional protein.

Functionally, TPPII has a key role in recycling amino acids, which are protein building blocks, a fundamental cellular process. Although the body can use alternative amino acid recycling pathways to compensate for loss of TPPII, the up-regulation of alternative pathways can cause new cellular abnormalities in itself with subsequent effects on glycolysis, adaptive immunity, and innate immunity. Consequently, individuals without functioning TPPII have severe disease.

=== Inheritance ===
TRIANGLE disease is inherited in an autosomal recessive manner. In autosomal recessive inheritance, two copies of an abnormal gene must be present in order for the disease to develop. Typically, this means both parents of an affected child silently carry one abnormal gene. This also means this also explains why reported cases of TRIANGLE disease have involved consanguinity or geographically isolated communities.

Parents of a child with TRIANGLE disease have a 25% chance of having another affected child with each pregnancy. This risk is independent of prior children's status. For example, if the first two children in a family are affected, the next child has the same 25% risk of inheriting the mutation. All affected individuals have two abnormal copies of TPP2. Children who inherit only one abnormal copy of TPP2 will not develop TRIANGLE disease although they may have affected children, particularly if they marry within the family.

== Diagnosis ==
=== Clinical manifestations ===
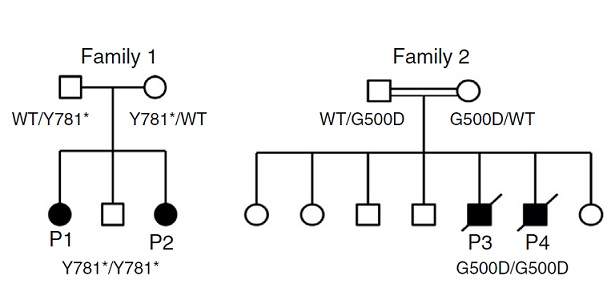
Two family pedigrees of TPPII deficiency patients.

Clinically, TRIANGLE disease is characterized combined immunodeficiency, severe autoimmunity, and developmental delay. Patients typically present in early childhood with recurrent bacterial and viral infections of the middle ear and respiratory tract. Additionally, patients develop severe, difficult to treat autoimmunity. This autoimmunity includes auto-antibody mediated destruction of red blood cells, neutrophils, and platelets; central nervous system lupus erythematous with stroke; and hepatitis. Patients also have mild to moderate developmental delay.

=== Laboratory manifestations ===
The clinical symptoms are caused by abnormalities of the immune system and disruption of basic cellular functions. Patients show markedly decreased circulating T cells, B cells and natural killer (NK) cells, with severely reduced naive T cells and hypergammaglobulinemia.

== Treatment ==
Once a diagnosis is made, the treatment is based on an individual's clinical condition and may include standard management for autoimmunity and immunodeficiency. Hematopoietic stem cell transplantation has cured the immune abnormalities in one TRIANGLE patient, although the neurodevelopmental delay would likely remain. Investigators at the National Institute of Allergy and Infectious Diseases at the US National Institutes of Health currently have clinical protocols to study new approaches to the diagnosis and treatment of this disorder.
