= Sibrotuzumab =

Monoclonal antibody

Monoclonal antibody
- Type: Whole antibody
- Source: Humanized (from mouse)
- Target: FAP

Clinical data
- ATC code: none

Identifiers
- CAS Number: 216669-97-5
- ChemSpider: none
- UNII: 552U6E1NIW

Sibrotuzumab is a humanized monoclonal antibody intended for the treatment of cancer. It binds to FAP

In 2003 it failed a phase II clinical trial for metastatic colorectal cancer.
