= Tariqilabeo adiscus =

Scientific classification
- Kingdom: Animalia
- Phylum: Chordata
- Class: Actinopterygii
- Order: Cypriniformes
- Family: Cyprinidae
- Genus: Tariqilabeo
- Species: T. adiscus

Binomial name
- Tariqilabeo adiscus (Annandale, 1919)

Synonyms
- Discognathus adiscus Annandale, 1919; Crossocheilus adiscus (Annandale, 1919); Gonorhynchus adiscus (Annandale, 1919)

Species of fish

Tariqilabeo adiscus, the Sistan latia, is a species of freshwater ray-finned fish belonging to the family Cyprinidae, the family which also includes the carps, barbs, minnows and related fishes. This species is found in eastern Iran, in the Hirmand River and the Chahnime Lakes in the Sistan region, and in the Helmand River in Afghanistan.
