= Direct participation program =

Financial security

Direct participation program (or direct participation plan or direct investment, abbreviated DPP) is a financial security that enables investors to participate in a business venture's cash flow and taxation benefits. The term originates from the Securities Act of 1933 and NASD Rule 2810, which addresses the regulation of compensation, fees and expenses in public offerings of DPPs.

Direct participation programs are most commonly formed to invest in real estate, energy, futures & options, and equipment leasing projects. A DPP is typically organized as a limited partnership or limited liability company, structures that enable the income and losses of the entity to flow-through to the underlying taxpayer on a pre-tax basis. As such, the DPP pays no tax at the corporate level. An investor's stake in the DPP is quantified in units and may be referred to as their interest. A non-listed real estate investment trust enjoys a special tax-free status if its distribution of income is sufficient, and as such may be organized as a corporation without being subject to double taxation.

The Investment Program Association is the U.S. trade association dedicated to the advancement of the asset class and the Real Estate Investment Association (www.reisa.org) provides education, networking and advocacy for members.

DPPs typically use a much wider, intermediary-dominated distribution network than other alternative investment funds. Broker/dealers have alternative investment platforms that include these funds and are paid commissions for their role in distribution and servicing. The compliance and operational aspects of sponsoring these funds are more complicated due to the involvement of retail investors and the payment of trailing commissions. DPP Transfer Agents provide outsourcing services to support IT and administrative functions.

DPP securities are generally not traded publicly, so the value of a DPP product is determined by the performance of the underlying assets rather than by the public markets. DPP products are generally illiquid for their duration, although some limited secondary markets may exist.

== Regulation and investor protection ==
Public offerings of direct participation programs in the United States are subject to specific rules governing underwriting compensation, organization and offering expenses, and investor suitability.

Because direct participation programs are generally not listed on public exchanges, valuation disclosure is also an important part of investor protection. Customer account statement rules require the inclusion of a per-share estimated value for direct participation program securities.

== See also ==
- Real estate investment association
