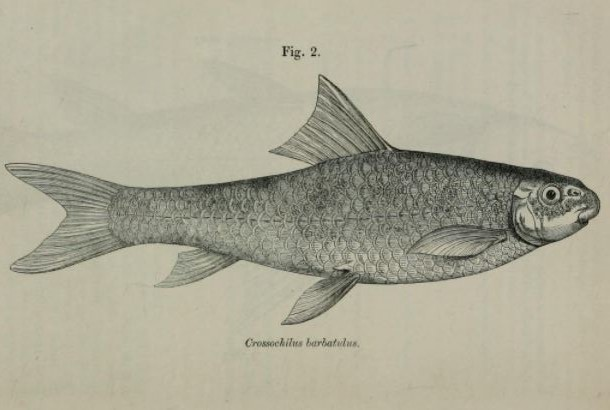

Conservation status
- Least Concern (IUCN 3.1)

Scientific classification
- Kingdom: Animalia
- Phylum: Chordata
- Class: Actinopterygii
- Order: Cypriniformes
- Family: Cyprinidae
- Genus: Tariqilabeo
- Species: T. diplochilus

Binomial name
- Tariqilabeo diplochilus (Heckel, 1838)

Synonyms
- Barbus diplochilus Heckel, 1838; Crossocheilus diplochilus (Heckel, 1844); Tylognathus barbatulus Heckel, 1844

= Tariqilabeo diplochilus =

Species of fish

Tariqilabeo diplochilus is a species of ray-finned fish in the genus Tariqilabeo. It is found in the Indus drainage in Pakistan, Afghanistan and India, extending into the Iranian Sistān, and coastal drainages in Pakistan.

== Size ==
This species reaches a length of 24.7 cm (9.7 in) and a weight of 119.2 g (4.2 oz).
