= Disability and Development Partners =

British disability charity

- Abbreviation: DDP
- Formation: February 28, 1992; 34 years ago
- Type: NGO
- Legal status: Foundation
- Purpose: Humanitarian
- Headquarters: London, England
- Region served: Burundi, Ethiopia, India, Mozambique and Nepal
- Chair of Trustees: Tom Crisp
- Executive Director: Kamala Achu
- Budget: ~ £750,000 / yr Fiscal year ending 31 March 2011
- Staff: 2
- Website: http://www.ddpuk.org
- Formerly called: Jaipur Limb Campaign (JLC)

Disability and Development Partners (DDP) (Note: The official registered name of the organization is "Disability and Development Partners (DDP) the new name of the Jaipur Limb Campaign (JLC)") is a UK charitable company limited by guarantee that works with local partners in South Asia and Africa. "DDP works in a holistic way, recognizing the correlation between poverty and disability and the importance of tackling social, economic and human rights issues through access to income generation and education opportunities as well as providing physical rehabilitation services."

DDP was founded in 1992 and registered as a UK charity in 1995 in London under its original name of Jaipur Limb Campaign (JLC). Recognised as a founding member of the UK Working Group on Landmines (established as the UK arm of the 1997 Nobel Peace Prize-winning International Campaign to Ban Landmines), JLC actively contributed to the UK campaign and helped strengthen the international campaign against landmines.

In 2005, JLC changed its name to Disability and Development Partners. The charity's name was originally inspired by the Indian-made Jaipur foot as JLC was campaigning for suitable rehabilitation services for the many thousands of amputees and victims of the widespread use of landmines in civil wars. The name change was motivated by the evolution of the mission of the charity over the years, broadening their field of work to all kinds of disabilities.

== Work and achievements ==
DDP does not perform development work itself; rather it collects donations in the UK to fund partner projects throughout the developing world. Over its 20-year history, DDP has helped fund projects through sixteen partnerships in eight different countries.

DDP established four rehabilitation centres providing prosthetic, orthotic and rehabilitation therapy services in Mozambique, Bangladesh, Ethiopia and India. In India, the charity has been supporting Mobility India to become a leading NGO helping to develop their technical, training and community based programmes and supporting the building of their modern and fully accessible headquarters to include a rehabilitation workshop, production facilities including a Jaipur foot production unit run by disabled women, a training centre and student dormitories. DDP has supported over fifty people, (of whom half are women and many are disabled) from partner organization in six countries who have received formal training and professional skills in orthotics, prosthetics and rehabilitation therapy. They return to improve and enhance rehabilitation services provided to disabled people by their own organizations and workshops.

The development and dissemination of prefabricated calliper components and ankle joints for rapid delivery of rehabilitation services was undertaken by DDP with Mobility India, who have subsequently disseminated these prefabricated components widely in India and in other countries where polio has been a problem. DDP set up Nepal's first Drop-in Centre for mentally ill people and their families and offering a safe haven for women who were forced into destitution because of mental illness.

The charity continued to support disabled people's human rights and inclusion campaigns in Mozambique, Angola, Nepal, India and Ethiopia. In Nepal, DDP's partner DHRC took their campaign to Supreme Court level in Nepal to ensure that disabled children and young people's right to a free education was protected.

The NGO is a member of the core group that wrote the World Health Organization's new improved Community Based Rehabilitation guidelines published in 2011. DDP has also been supporting the development and building capacity of Aurora Deaf Aid Africa, a UK-based Diaspora group of deaf people.

Livelihood programmes were established targeting thousands of disabled adults and parents and family members of disabled children to reduce poverty among disabled people and their families in India, Mozambique, Angola, Cape Verde and Ethiopia. Inclusive education programmes in India and Ethiopia enabled hundreds of disabled and other marginalized children to have a chance in education and to change their lives for the better.

DDP has conducted research that has led to project work. In Mozambique they researched and reported on HIV and AIDS and the extent of disabled people's knowledge about the two and of their inclusion in prevention programmes and services as well as in national policies to do with HIV and AIDS. They used the research findings to develop programmes to get more disabled people included in mainstream HIV and AIDS projects, get services, create awareness and ensure their inclusion in national HIV and AIDS policy. In 2011 DDP produced a report on deaf children in Burundi, in particular their education and communication needs which led to funds being raised to support one of the only two deaf schools in Burundi and to support pupils who wanted to progress to hearing secondary school. There are no secondary schools for the deaf in the country.

== Publications ==
HIV & AIDS and Disability in Mozambique (April 2008)

The report underlines the exclusion of disabled people from HIV & AIDS policies and service programmes and to identify the causes and implications of this neglect. The omission of disabled people from supra-national development instruments mirrors more general discrimination and reflects disabled people's voicelessness and invisibility in Mozambique. The report explains the need for disabled people to be included in the country's HIV/AIDS policy and decisions, treatment and prevention programmes and to increase disabled people's awareness of HIV & AIDS.

Deaf children in Burundi – their education and communications needs (October 2011)

The participative research brings together associations, schools, government representatives and above all, deaf children themselves and their parents to understand the problems they face and their aspirations for the future and then to try to identify practical strategies to meet both. The study analyses the status and standard of sign language as currently used in Burundi.
