= Disney Dining Plan =

Prepaid Walt Disney World meal package

- The logo pointing out foodstuffs that count towards snack credits on the Disney Dining Plan
- Location: Walt Disney World Resort
- Launched: 2005
- Operator: Walt Disney Parks and Resorts
- Currency: USD ($48.19–$106.68 per adult, per night; $20.88–$38.75 per child, per night)
- Stored-value: Prepaid meals and snacks
- Credit expiry: End of Walt Disney World guest's stay
- Validity: Select restaurants, food carts, and stores in Walt Disney World's parks, resort hotels, and Disney Springs
- Retailed: Online; Telephone
- Variants: Disney Quick-Service Dining Plan; Disney Dining Plan; Disney Deluxe Dining Plan
- Website: Information page on the Walt Disney World website

The Disney Dining Plan is a prepaid meal package that guests staying at Walt Disney World hotels can purchase to receive discounts of up to 30% on food in the complex. It was first introduced in 2005 and has developed in complexity over time, so there are now many different plan forms. The Disney Dining Plan allows guests to eat at park restaurants without needing to have cash on their persons. The plan does now include alcoholic beverages but not gratuities. More than 100 Walt Disney World restaurants accept the plan. The plan is particularly cost-effective for families who intend to eat many meals at sit-down restaurants or character dining restaurants. However, to get the most value (or to break even) when using the plan, families must be mindful when using their Dining Plan Credits otherwise they may risk spending more than if they ordered the same food but paid out of pocket.

The plan has been criticized for various reasons, including that servers need to be more knowledgeable about which food items are considered meals and which are considered snacks. The introduction of the Disney Dining Plan resulted in more parents bringing their children to Walt Disney World's most expensive restaurants, which Kim Wiley and Leigh Jenkins write in their book Walt Disney World with Kids 2013 "is indirectly taking a little of the adult feel and glamour out of these top restaurants." In the book Mousejunkies!, Bill Burke complains that the Disney Dining Plan has restricted restaurant menus. Annie Oeth of The Clarion-Ledger argues that the Disney Dining Plan is a poor choice for families with picky eaters.

After Disney World closed in March 2020 due to the COVID-19 pandemic, the dining plan was suspended. On May 8, 2023, Disney announced that the dining plan would return on January 9, 2024 with bookings starting on May 31, 2023.

== Bibliography ==
- Bradshaw, Kate; Rona Gindin; Jennifer Greenhill-Taylor; Jennie Hess; Gary McKechnie (2012). Fodor's 2013 Walt Disney World: With Universal, Seaworld, and the Best of Central Florida. Fodor's. ISBN 0307929442.
- Burke, Bill (2011). Mousejunkies!: More Tips, Tales, and Tricks for a Disney World Fix. Travelers' Tales. ISBN 160952022X.
- Gindin, Rona (2009). Little Black Book of Disney. Peter Pauper Press. ISBN 1441305130.
- Miller, Laura Lea (2011). Frommer's Walt Disney World and Orlando 2012 (13 ed.). John Wiley & Sons. ISBN 1118168046.
- Sehlinger, Bob; Len Testa (2014). The Unofficial Guide: The Color Companion to Walt Disney World. Unofficial Guides. ISBN 1628090286.
- Veness, Susan; Simon Veness (2012). The Hidden Magic of Walt Disney World Planner: A Complete Organizer, Journal, and Keepsake for Your Unforgettable Vacation. F+W. ISBN 1440528101.
- Wiley, Kim Wright; Leigh C. W. Jenkins (2012). Walt Disney World with Kids 2013: With Universal Orlando, Seaworld and Aquatica. Fodor's. ISBN 0307929221.
