= Dipeptidyl-peptidase II =

Identifiers
- EC no.: 3.4.14.2
- CAS no.: 76199-23-0

Databases
- IntEnz: IntEnz view
- BRENDA: BRENDA entry
- ExPASy: NiceZyme view
- KEGG: KEGG entry
- MetaCyc: metabolic pathway
- PRIAM: profile
- PDB structures: RCSB PDB PDBe PDBsum
Search
- PMC: articles
- PubMed: articles
- NCBI: proteins

Dipeptidyl-peptidase II (EC 3.4.14.2, dipeptidyl aminopeptidase II, dipeptidyl arylamidase II, carboxytripeptidase, dipeptidyl peptidase II, DAP II, dipeptidyl(amino)peptidase II, dipeptidylarylamidase) is an enzyme. This enzyme catalyses the following chemical reaction:

Release of an N-terminal dipeptide, Xaa-Yaa!, preferentially when Yaa is Ala or Pro. Substrates are oligopeptides, preferentially tripeptides

This lysosomal serine-type peptidase is maximally active at acidic pH.
