= Digital Production Partnership =

Initiative by UK public service broadcasters in digital television production

The Digital Production Partnership (DPP) is an initiative formed jointly by the UK's public service broadcasters to help producers and broadcasters maximise the potential benefits of digital television production.

In 2009 representatives from across the TV industry identified key areas where they felt the broadcasters could undertake work that would make a real difference in the transition to digital production, ideally helping TV producers and post-production houses overcome the complexities and get to the benefits of digital working more quickly.

The areas identified formed the basis for the DPP's working groups, drawing on industry experts from all areas of TV production and technology. This included work on common technical and metadata standards for digital TV production and sharing best practice in digital production across the industry.

From 1 April 2015 the DPP became a not-for-profit company limited by guarantee: Digital Production Partnership Ltd.

To date, the DPP has been funded by the BBC, ITV and Channel 4. These broadcasters continue to provide lead funding, but becoming a Membership organisation means the DPP is now more directly accountable to all those it works on behalf of, from across the whole industry. It continues to be core to the purpose of the DPP to reduce complexity and increase interoperability across the industry – everywhere.

The DPP works closely with trade bodies such as AMWA (Advanced Media Workflow Association) in the US, EBU (European Broadcasting Union), UK Screen (Post Production representatives) and the PMA (Production Managers Association) to articulate the needs of the UK TV production industry.

The DPP has also shared their portfolio of industry standards and guidelines with the BBC Academy College of Technology and Creative Skillset's media academies in order to help train digital television programme makers.

== Technical & Metadata Standards ==
In March 2011 the DPP created common technical standards for tape delivery of HDTV and SDTV programmes to all major UK broadcasters at the time. UK TV producers now have one set of guidelines that cover technical specifications, picture and sound quality for delivery to ITV, BBC, Channel 4, Sky, Channel 5, BT Sport and S4C.

In January 2012 the DPP announced that these broadcasters had also agreed the UK's first common file format, structure and wrapper to enable TV programme delivery by digital file. The guidelines complement the common standards for tape delivery of HD and SD TV programmes and endeavour to avoid a situation where a number of different file types and specifications proliferate. The inclusion of editorial and technical metadata creates a consistent set of information for the processing, review, and scheduling of programmes, as well as their onward archiving, sale and distribution across the television industry.

These standards do not prescribe the suitability of particular cameras, or post-production technologies, as these can vary from production to production and remain subject to discussion between producer and broadcaster.

In October 2012 the DPP standards were updated to include guidelines for live programme delivery via satellite, fibre and microwave links. The use of MPEG-4 is recommended in these standards due to its superior quality over MPEG-2 for a given data rate.

The Advanced Media Workflow Association (AMWA) in the US worked with the DPP to create AS-11, a new international file format for HD Files. The DPP guidelines require files delivered to UK broadcasters to be compliant with a specified subset of this new, international standard.

In September 2012 the DPP released a downloadable metadata application, developed in order to enable standardised editorial & technical metadata to be delivered with completed MXF programme files. This is intended to be an interim measure until equipment and system suppliers are able to offer this functionality within their systems.

An update to the DPP Technical Standards (v4.0), the DPP Metadata Application (v1.2) & the AMWA specification in October 2013 includes audio production to the EBU R128 loudness specifications along with other changes such as guidance on use for UHD (4K) cameras and an addition for the carriage of multichannel audio metadata within a programme file.

In Jan 2016 the DPP released Common Technical Delivery Standards for High Definition Commercials/Sponsorship and Promotions/Presentation material. and their first future-focused standard, a technical standard for the delivery of Ultra High Definition (UHD) programmes.

However, the DPP "standards" are a misnomer; they are actually recommended practices. To be a standard they would have to be approved and certified by an organisation such as ISO or ANSI and follow the practices that other standards bodies in the industry such as IEEE, SMPTE and others adhere to.

== Compliance Programme ==
The DPP launched a Compliance Programme in Mar 2014 to help the industry identify trusted products, such as Vidchecks software, which work with AS-11 DPP files and to speed the implementation of the file-based delivery process by ensuring products can correctly create, read and / or process files which meet the AS-11 DPP standard.

The DPP worked closely with the Advanced Media Workflow Association (AMWA) to develop a testing and certification process. This focuses on testing product conformance to the UK DPP Shims of the AMWA AS-11 Specification (beginning with AS-11 DPP HD).

== Progress of Digital TV Production in the UK ==
During 2012/13 ITV, BBC, and Channel 4 began to take delivery of programmes on file on a selective basis.

In September 2013 the DPP announced that File based delivery would become the preferred delivery format for these broadcasters from 2014 and on 1 October 2014 end-to-end digital finally became a reality.

The DPP continues to work on various subjects including connectivity; news exchange; a mastering format; Live IP Production; standards of trust and international exchange.

== International Adoption ==
Although the DPP is formed of broadcasters from the UK, international interest in the work undertaken by the industry partnership is growing rapidly. For example, work is ongoing by the AMWA to create a standard called AS-11 NA (North America).

Also, the Norwegian Broadcasting Corporation NRK has based its latest Technical Standards document on the DPP standards.

In 2015 the DPP starting working with the North American Broadcasters Association (NABA) on a common standard for delivery across North America, for publication during 2016.
