= Department of Plant Protection =

Pakistani government agency

Department of Plant Protection (DPP)
- محکمہ تحفظِ نباتات ، پاکستان

Agency overview
- Jurisdiction: Pakistan
- Headquarters: Islamabad, Pakistan
- Website: plantprotection.gov.pk

The Department of Plant Protection (DPP) (Urdu: محکمہ تحفظِ نباتات ، پاکستان was a department of the Ministry of National Food Security and Research of the Government of Pakistan. In 2025, it was replaced by the National Agri-trade and Food Safety Authority.

It worked under the following pieces of legislation and regulation of the Government of Pakistan: (i) Plant Quarantine Act 1976 (ii) Agricultural Pesticide Rules and (iii) Agricultural Pesticide Ordinance.

The department consisted of the following four divisions and wings:

- Plant Quarantine
- Pesticide Registration
- Locust Control and Survey
- Aerial Wing

In addition, the department also operates the following two laboratories:

- Central Plant Quarantine Lab
- Federal Pesticide Testing and Reference Lab

== Executives ==
- Federal Minister
- Federal Secretary
- Director General
