= DPP8 =

Protein-coding gene in humans

Identifiers
- Aliases: DPP8, DP8, DPRP1, MSTP141, MST097, MSTP097, MSTP135, DPRP-1, dipeptidyl peptidase 8
- External IDs: OMIM: 606819; MGI: 1921638; GeneCards: DPP8
Enzyme activity
EC #	BRENDA	ExPASy	KEGG	MetaCyc
3.4.14.5	↗	↗	↗	↗

Gene location (Human)
Chr.	Chromosome 15 (human)
Band	15q22.31	Start	65,442,463 bp
Band	15q22.31	End	65,517,704 bp

Gene location (Mouse)
Chr.	Chromosome 9 (mouse)
Band	9|9 C	Start	64,939,696 bp
Band	9|9 C	End	64,989,933 bp
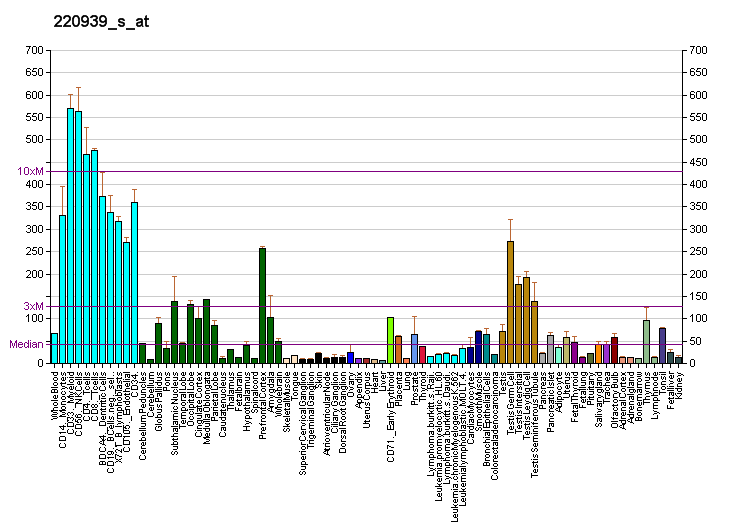
RNA expression pattern
Bgee	Human / Mouse (ortholog); Top expressed in: buccal mucosa cell; secondary oocyte; nipple; middle temporal gyrus; pons; postcentral gyrus; Skeletal muscle tissue of rectus abdominis; lateral nuclear group of thalamus; Brodmann area 23; biceps brachii / Top expressed in: spermatocyte; muscle of thigh; superior frontal gyrus; aortic valve; cerebellar cortex; dentate gyrus of hippocampal formation granule cell; ascending aorta; temporal muscle; inferior colliculi; perirhinal cortex; More reference expression data
BioGPS	More reference expression data
Gene ontology
Molecular function	peptidase activity; serine-type peptidase activity; aminopeptidase activity; dipeptidyl-peptidase activity; hydrolase activity
Cellular component	cytoplasm; cytosol
Biological process	immune response; proteolysis; apoptotic process
Sources:Amigo / QuickGO
Orthologs
Databases	NCBI: entry; OMA: entry
Species	Human	Mouse
Entrez	54878	74388
Ensembl	ENSG00000074603	ENSMUSG00000032393
UniProt	Q6V1X1	Q80YA7
RefSeq (mRNA)	NM_017743; NM_130434; NM_197960; NM_197961; NM_001320875 NM_001320876	NM_028906; NM_001401136
RefSeq (protein)	NP_001307804; NP_001307805; NP_060213; NP_569118; NP_932064 NP_932065; NP_932064.1; NP_001307804.1	NP_083182; NP_001388065
Location (UCSC)	Chr 15: 65.44 – 65.52 Mb	Chr 9: 64.94 – 64.99 Mb
PubMed search
- Wikidata
View/Edit Human	View/Edit Mouse

Dipeptidyl peptidase 8 is an enzyme that in humans is encoded by the DPP8 gene.

This gene encodes a member of the peptidase S9B family, a small family of dipeptidyl peptidases that are able to cleave peptide substrates at a prolyl bond. The encoded protein shares similarity with dipeptidyl peptidase-4 in that it is ubiquitously expressed, and hydrolyzes the same substrates. These similarities suggest that, like dipeptidyl peptidase IV, this protein may play a role in T-cell activation and immune function. Alternatively spliced transcript variants encoding different isoforms have been described. A relatively specific inhibitor of DPP8 and DPP9, Val-boroPro -, leads to increased activation of the inflammasome though both NLRBP1 and CARD8 and can trigger pyroptosis.
