= DPP9 =

Protein-coding gene in humans

Identifiers
- Aliases: DPP9, DP9, DPLP9, DPRP-2, DPRP2, dipeptidyl peptidase 9, DPP IX
- External IDs: OMIM: 608258; MGI: 2443967; GeneCards: DPP9
Enzyme activity
EC #	BRENDA	ExPASy	KEGG	MetaCyc
3.4.14.5	↗	↗	↗	↗

Gene location (Human)
Chr.	Chromosome 19 (human)
Band	19p13.3	Start	4,675,224 bp
Band	19p13.3	End	4,724,673 bp

Gene location (Mouse)
Chr.	Chromosome 17 (mouse)
Band	17|17 D	Start	56,493,807 bp
Band	17|17 D	End	56,525,905 bp
RNA expression pattern
Bgee	Human / Mouse (ortholog); Top expressed in: gastrocnemius muscle; muscle of thigh; right lobe of liver; granulocyte; pancreatic ductal cell; appendix; upper lobe of left lung; mucosa of transverse colon; epithelium of colon; apex of heart / Top expressed in: interventricular septum; islet of Langerhans; muscle of thigh; internal carotid artery; Rostral migratory stream; lacrimal gland; knee joint; external carotid artery; primary visual cortex; skeletal muscle tissue; More reference expression data
BioGPS	n/a
Gene ontology
Molecular function	peptidase activity; serine-type peptidase activity; aminopeptidase activity; hydrolase activity; identical protein binding
Cellular component	nucleus; cytoplasm; cytosol
Biological process	proteolysis
Sources:Amigo / QuickGO
Orthologs
Databases	NCBI: entry; OMA: entry
Species	Human	Mouse
Entrez	91039	224897
Ensembl	ENSG00000142002	ENSMUSG00000001229
UniProt	Q86TI2	Q8BVG4
RefSeq (mRNA)	NM_139159; NM_001365987	NM_172624; NM_001360284
RefSeq (protein)	NP_631898; NP_001352916	NP_766212; NP_001347213
Location (UCSC)	Chr 19: 4.68 – 4.72 Mb	Chr 17: 56.49 – 56.53 Mb
PubMed search
- Wikidata
View/Edit Human	View/Edit Mouse

Dipeptidyl peptidase 9 is an enzyme that in humans is encoded by the DPP9 gene.

== Function ==
This gene encodes a protein that is a member of the S9B family in clan SC of the serine proteases. The protein has been shown to have post-proline dipeptidyl aminopeptidase activity, cleaving Xaa-Pro dipeptides from the N-termini of proteins. Although the activity of this protein is similar to that of dipeptidyl peptidase 4 (DPP4), it does not appear to be membrane bound.

In general, dipeptidyl peptidases appear to be involved in the regulation of the activity of their substrates and have been linked to a variety of diseases including type 2 diabetes, obesity and cancer. Several transcript variants of this gene have been described but not fully characterized. More specifically, DPP9 interacts with the NLRP1 protein and affects the level of activation of the NLRP1 inflammasome. This function involves binding to a complex of full-length NLRP1 and a proinflammatory fragment of NLRP1 after activation by autocleavage. A similar mechanism allows DPP9 to regulate the CARD8 inflammasome.

== Animal studies ==
Genetic analysis of knockout alleles of DPP9 in mice and zebrafish showed a severe phenotype that could be rescued by mutation of NLPR1.

== Clinical significance ==
Mutations in NLRP1 that block DPP9 interaction lead to a rare Mendelian condition called Autoinflammation with Arthritis and Dyskeratosis A homozygous recessive syndrome dubbed Hatipoğlu syndrome is attributed to mutations in DPP9 with a phenotype of failure to thrive, skin manifestations, pancytopenia, and susceptibility to infections.

This gene has also been linked to severe COVID-19.
