= DPP7 =

Protein-coding gene in the species Homo sapiens

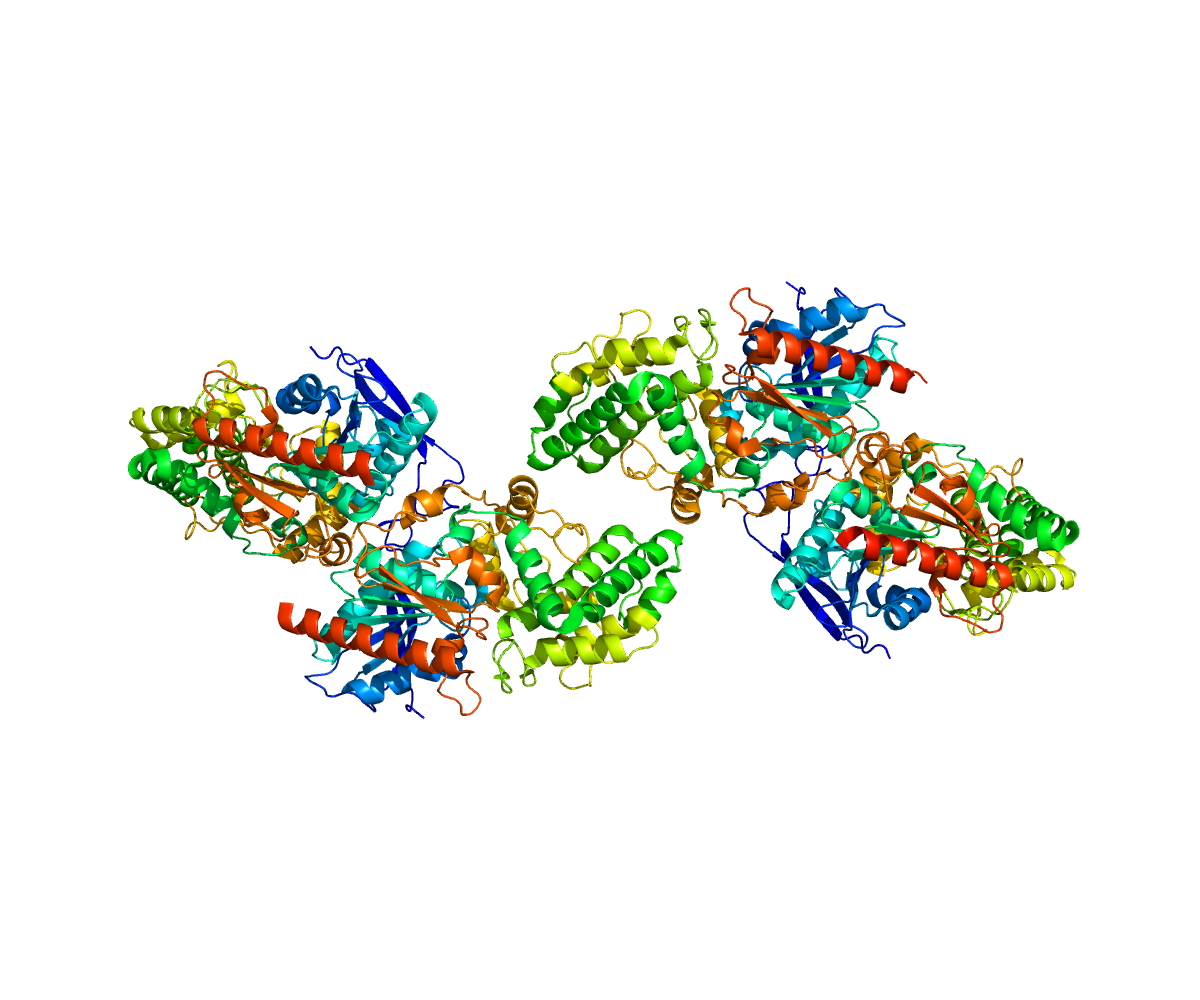

Identifiers
- Aliases: DPP7, DPP2, DPPII, QPP, dipeptidyl peptidase 7
- External IDs: OMIM: 610537; MGI: 1933213; GeneCards: DPP7
Available structures
PDB	Ortholog search: PDBe RCSB
PDB	List of PDB id codes 3JYH, 3N0T, 4EBB
Enzyme activity
EC #	BRENDA	ExPASy	KEGG	MetaCyc
3.4.14.2	↗	↗	↗	↗

Gene location (Human)
Chr.	Chromosome 9 (human)
Band	9q34.3	Start	137,110,546 bp
Band	9q34.3	End	137,115,177 bp

Gene location (Mouse)
Chr.	Chromosome 2 (mouse)
Band	2|2 A3	Start	25,242,288 bp
Band	2|2 A3	End	25,246,371 bp
RNA expression pattern
Bgee	Human / Mouse (ortholog); Top expressed in: anterior pituitary; right hemisphere of cerebellum; right uterine tube; granulocyte; right lobe of thyroid gland; left testis; apex of heart; right testis; left lobe of thyroid gland; right frontal lobe / Top expressed in: choroid plexus of fourth ventricle; yolk sac; right kidney; epithelium of small intestine; calvaria; proximal tubule; human kidney; decidua; Epithelium of choroid plexus; iris; More reference expression data
BioGPS	n/a
Gene ontology
Molecular function	peptidase activity; hydrolase activity; aminopeptidase activity; serine-type peptidase activity; dipeptidyl-peptidase activity
Cellular component	cytosol; Golgi apparatus; lysosome; cytoplasmic vesicle; vesicle; intracellular membrane-bounded organelle; extracellular exosome; extracellular region; azurophil granule lumen
Biological process	neutrophil degranulation; proteolysis
Sources:Amigo / QuickGO
Orthologs
Databases	NCBI: entry; OMA: entry
Species	Human	Mouse
Entrez	29952	83768
Ensembl	ENSG00000176978	ENSMUSG00000026958
UniProt	Q9UHL4	Q9ET22
RefSeq (mRNA)	NM_013379	NM_031843
RefSeq (protein)	NP_037511	NP_114031
Location (UCSC)	Chr 9: 137.11 – 137.12 Mb	Chr 2: 25.24 – 25.25 Mb
PubMed search
- Wikidata
View/Edit Human	View/Edit Mouse

Dipeptidyl-peptidase 2 (sometimes also called Dipeptidyl-peptidase 7) is an enzyme that in humans is encoded by the DPP7 gene.

The protein encoded by this gene is a post-proline cleaving aminopeptidase expressed in quiescent lymphocytes. The resting lymphocytes are maintained through suppression of apoptosis, a state which is disrupted by inhibition of this novel serine protease. The enzyme has strong sequence homology with prolyl carboxypeptidase and is active at both acidic and neutral pH.
