= Tripeptidyl peptidase II =

Protein-coding gene in the species Homo sapiens

TPP2

Identifiers
- Aliases: TPP2, TPP-2, TPPII, Tripeptidyl peptidase II, tripeptidyl peptidase 2, TPP-II, IMD78
- External IDs: OMIM: 190470; MGI: 102724; GeneCards: TPP2
Enzyme activity
EC #	BRENDA	ExPASy	KEGG	MetaCyc
3.4.14.10	↗	↗	↗	↗

Gene location (Human)
Chr.	Chromosome 13 (human)
Band	13q33.1	Start	102,596,986 bp
Band	13q33.1	End	102,679,958 bp

Gene location (Mouse)
Chr.	Chromosome 1 (mouse)
Band	1 C1.1|1 23.5 cM	Start	43,972,807 bp
Band	1 C1.1|1 23.5 cM	End	44,042,160 bp
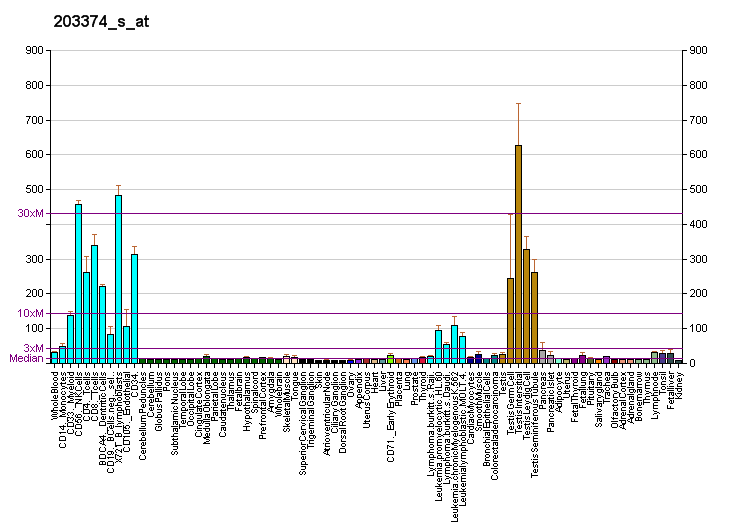

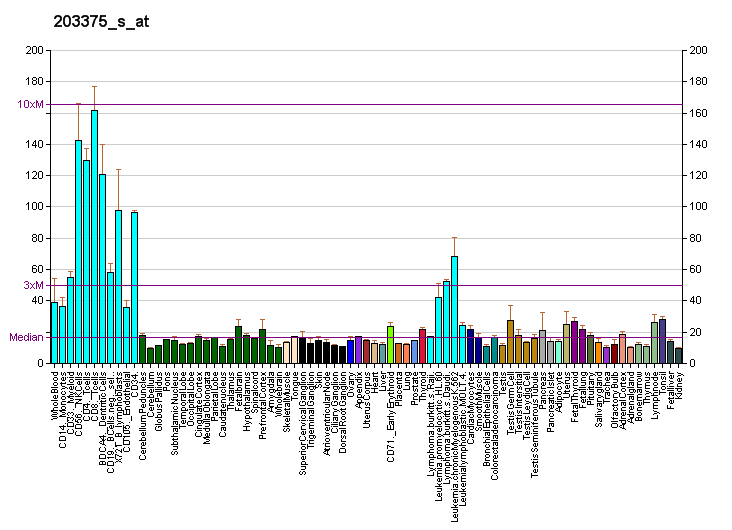
RNA expression pattern
Bgee	Human / Mouse (ortholog); Top expressed in: left testis; right testis; sperm; Achilles tendon; epithelium of colon; monocyte; rectum; testicle; muscle of thigh; right uterine tube / Top expressed in: spermatid; spermatocyte; seminiferous tubule; tail of embryo; esophagus; mandibular prominence; maxillary prominence; atrioventricular valve; gastrula; Gonadal ridge; More reference expression data
BioGPS	More reference expression data
Gene ontology
Molecular function	tripeptidyl-peptidase activity; peptidase activity; endopeptidase activity; serine-type peptidase activity; protein binding; hydrolase activity; aminopeptidase activity; serine-type endopeptidase activity; identical protein binding
Cellular component	nucleus; nucleoplasm; cytoplasm; cytosol; nuclear body
Biological process	protein polyubiquitination; proteolysis
Sources:Amigo / QuickGO
Orthologs
Databases	NCBI: entry; OMA: entry
Species	Human	Mouse
Entrez	7174	22019
Ensembl	ENSG00000134900	ENSMUSG00000041763
UniProt	P29144	Q64514
RefSeq (mRNA)	NM_003291; NM_001330588; NM_001367947	NM_009418; NM_001310540
RefSeq (protein)	NP_001317517; NP_003282; NP_001354876	NP_001297469; NP_033444
Location (UCSC)	Chr 13: 102.6 – 102.68 Mb	Chr 1: 43.97 – 44.04 Mb
PubMed search
- Wikidata
View/Edit Human	View/Edit Mouse

Tripeptidyl-peptidase 2 is an enzyme that in humans is encoded by the TPP2 gene. Among other things it is heavily implicated in MHC (HLA) class-I processing, as it has both endopeptidase and exopeptidase activity.

== Clinical significance and genetic deficiency ==
Biallelic deleterious variants in the TPP2 gene may result in a recessive disorder with immune deficiency, autoimmune disease and intellectual disability. Some genetic variants may result in a milder disease with sterile brain inflammation mimicking multiple sclerosis. These observations underline the fundamental role of TPP2 in cells of the immune system.

=== TRIANGLE disease ===
TRIANGLE disease is a rare genetic disorder of the immune system. TRIANGLE stands for "TPPII-related immunodeficiency, autoimmunity, and neurodevelopmental delay with impaired glycolysis and lysosomal expansion" where TPP2 is the causative gene. This disease manifests as recurrent infection, autoimmunity, and neurodevelopmental delay. TRIANGLE disease was first described in a collaborative study by Dr. Helen C. Su from the National Institute of Allergy and Infectious Diseases, National Institutes of Health, and Dr. Sophie Hambleton from the University of Newcastle and their collaborators in 2014. The disease was also described by the group of Ehl et al.
