= Caspase recruitment domain-containing protein 8 =

Protein found in humans

CARD8

Identifiers
- Aliases: CARD8, CARDINAL, DACAR, DAKAR, NDPP, NDPP1, TUCAN, caspase recruitment domain family member 8
- External IDs: OMIM: 609051; GeneCards: CARD8
Available structures
PDB	Human UniProt search: PDBe RCSB
PDB	List of PDB id codes 4IKM

Gene location (Human)
Chr.	Chromosome 19 (human)
Band	19q13.33	Start	48,180,770 bp
Band	19q13.33	End	48,255,946 bp
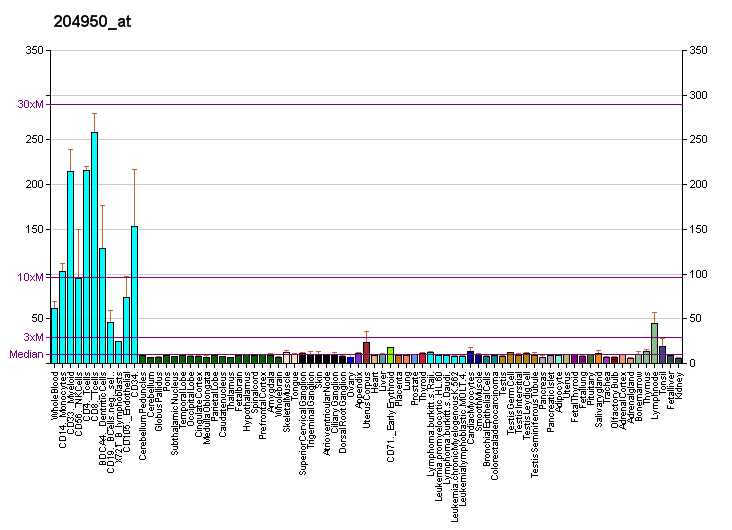
RNA expression pattern
Bgee	Human / Mouse (ortholog); Top expressed in: monocyte; granulocyte; spleen; buccal mucosa cell; blood; lymph node; gallbladder; appendix; Achilles tendon; right lung / n/a; More reference expression data
BioGPS	More reference expression data
Gene ontology
Molecular function	cysteine-type endopeptidase activator activity involved in apoptotic process; protein binding; protein homodimerization activity; NACHT domain binding; CARD domain binding; identical protein binding
Cellular component	NLRP3 inflammasome complex; nucleoplasm; cytoplasm; nucleus; cytosol; protein-containing complex; inflammasome complex
Biological process	apoptotic process; regulation of apoptotic process; positive regulation of cysteine-type endopeptidase activity involved in apoptotic process; negative regulation of I-kappaB kinase/NF-kappaB signaling; activation of cysteine-type endopeptidase activity involved in apoptotic process; negative regulation of tumor necrosis factor-mediated signaling pathway; negative regulation of lipopolysaccharide-mediated signaling pathway; negative regulation of NF-kappaB transcription factor activity; inhibition of cysteine-type endopeptidase activity
Sources:Amigo / QuickGO
Orthologs
Databases	NCBI: entry; OMA: entry
Species	Human	Mouse
Entrez	22900	n/a
Ensembl	ENSG00000105483	n/a
UniProt	Q9Y2G2	n/a
RefSeq (mRNA)	NM_001184900; NM_001184901; NM_001184902; NM_001184903; NM_001184904 NM_014959; NM_001351782; NM_001351783; NM_001351784; NM_001351786; NM_001351787; NM_001351788; NM_001351789; NM_001351790; NM_001351791; NM_001351792; NM_001365950	n/a
RefSeq (protein)	NP_001171829; NP_001171830; NP_001171831; NP_001171832; NP_001171833 NP_055774; NP_001338711; NP_001338712; NP_001338713; NP_001338715; NP_001338716; NP_001338717; NP_001338718; NP_001338719; NP_001338720; NP_001338721; NP_001352879	n/a
Location (UCSC)	Chr 19: 48.18 – 48.26 Mb	n/a
PubMed search		n/a
- Wikidata
View/Edit Human

Caspase recruitment domain-containing protein 8 is a protein that in humans is encoded by the CARD8 gene.

== Function ==
Caspase recruitment domain (CARD)-containing proteins, such as CARD8, are involved in pathways leading to activation of caspases or nuclear factor kappa-B (NF-κB) in the context of apoptosis or inflammation, respectively.
