= DPP6 =

Human protein and coding gene

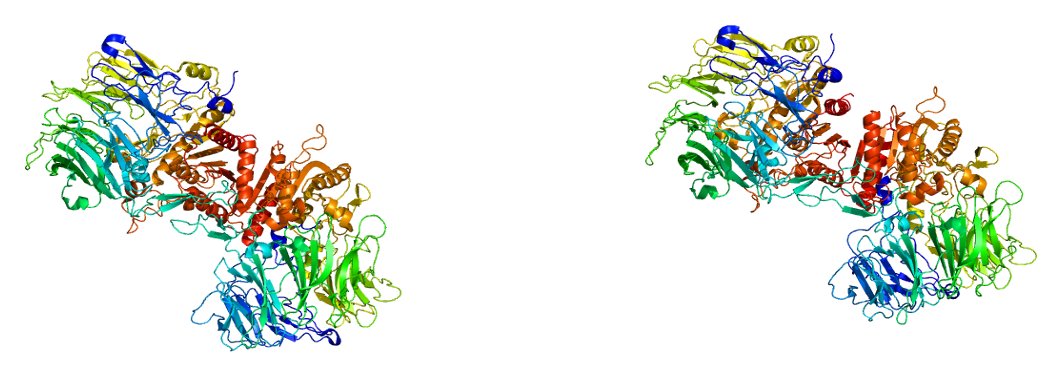

Identifiers
- Aliases: DPP6, DPPX, VF2, MRD33, DPL1, dipeptidyl peptidase like 6
- External IDs: OMIM: 126141; MGI: 94921; GeneCards: DPP6
Available structures
PDB	Ortholog search: PDBe RCSB
PDB	List of PDB id codes 1XFD

Gene location (Human)
Chr.	Chromosome 7 (human)
Band	7q36.2	Start	153,887,097 bp
Band	7q36.2	End	154,894,285 bp

Gene location (Mouse)
Chr.	Chromosome 5 (mouse)
Band	5 B1|5 12.92 cM	Start	27,022,201 bp
Band	5 B1|5 12.92 cM	End	27,932,503 bp
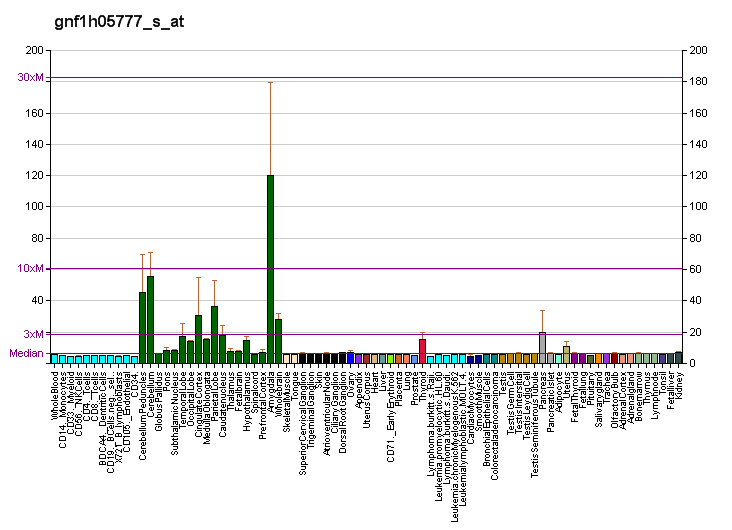

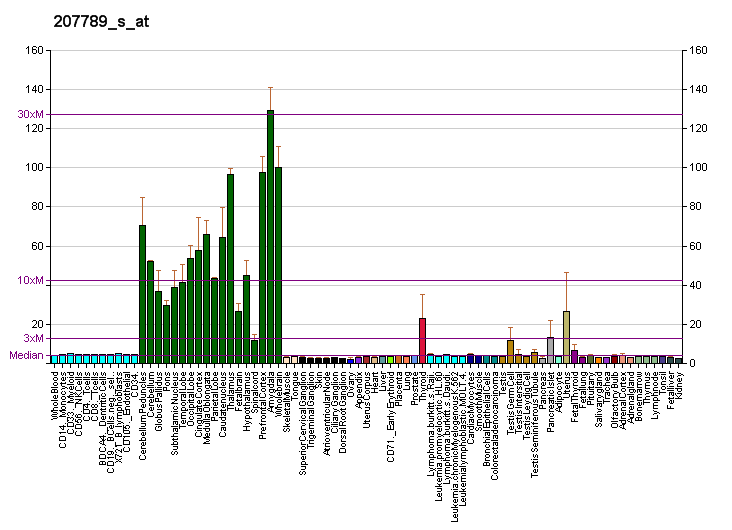
RNA expression pattern
Bgee	Human / Mouse (ortholog); Top expressed in: middle temporal gyrus; Brodmann area 23; endothelial cell; pons; lateral nuclear group of thalamus; primary visual cortex; superior frontal gyrus; postcentral gyrus; entorhinal cortex; Region I of hippocampus proper / Top expressed in: dentate gyrus of hippocampal formation granule cell; cerebellar cortex; habenula; superior frontal gyrus; primary visual cortex; dorsomedial hypothalamic nucleus; paraventricular nucleus of hypothalamus; superior colliculus; supraoptic nucleus; ventral tegmental area; More reference expression data
BioGPS	More reference expression data
Gene ontology
Molecular function	potassium channel regulator activity; serine-type peptidase activity; dipeptidyl-peptidase activity
Cellular component	integral component of membrane; plasma membrane; membrane; voltage-gated potassium channel complex
Biological process	protein localization to plasma membrane; regulation of potassium ion transmembrane transport; proteolysis
Sources:Amigo / QuickGO
Orthologs
Databases	NCBI: entry; OMA: entry
Species	Human	Mouse
Entrez	1804	13483
Ensembl	ENSG00000130226; ENSG00000282974	ENSMUSG00000061576
UniProt	P42658; Q8IYG9	Q9Z218
RefSeq (mRNA)	NM_001039350; NM_001290252; NM_001290253; NM_001936; NM_130797	NM_001136060; NM_001198886; NM_010075; NM_207282
RefSeq (protein)	NP_001034439; NP_001277181; NP_001277182; NP_001927; NP_570629 NP_001351426; NP_001351427; NP_001351428; NP_001351429; NP_001351430; NP_001351431; NP_001277182.1; NP_570629.2; NP_001034439.1; NP_001277181.1; NP_001927.3; NP_570629.2	NP_001129532; NP_001185815; NP_034205; NP_997165
Location (UCSC)	Chr 7: 153.89 – 154.89 Mb	Chr 5: 27.02 – 27.93 Mb
PubMed search
- Wikidata
View/Edit Human	View/Edit Mouse

Dipeptidyl aminopeptidase-like protein 6 is a protein that in humans is encoded by the DPP6 gene.

This gene encodes a single-pass type II membrane protein that is a member of the S9B family in clan SC of the serine proteases. This protein has no detectable protease activity, most likely due to the absence of the conserved serine residue normally present in the catalytic domain of serine proteases. However, it does bind specific voltage-gated potassium channels and alters their expression and biophysical properties. Alternate transcriptional splice variants, encoding different isoforms, have been characterized.
