= Mizagliflozin =

Chemical compound

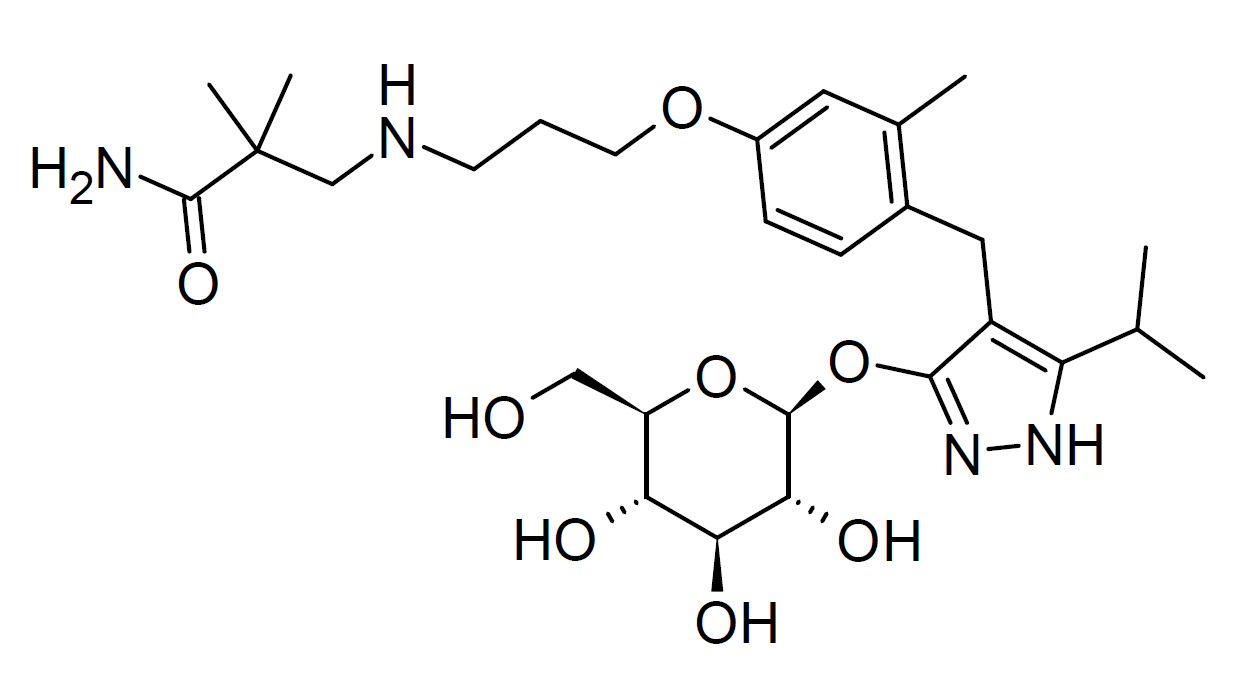

Legal status
- Legal status: Investigational

Identifiers
- IUPAC name: 2,2-dimethyl-3-([3-{4-[(3-{[(2S,3R,4S,5S,6R)-3,4,5-trihydroxy-6-(hydroxymethyl)oxan-2-yl]oxy}-5-(propan-2-yl)-1H-pyrazol-4-yl)methyl]-3-methylphenoxy}propyl]amino)propanamide
- CAS Number: 666843-10-3
- PubChem CID: 10460535
- ChemSpider: 8635948
- UNII: 1X96A704XV
- ChEMBL: ChEMBL5314923

Chemical and physical data
- Formula: C_{28}H_{44}N_{4}O_{8}
- Molar mass: 564.680 g·mol^{−1}
- 3D model (JSmol): Interactive image
- SMILES: Cc1cc(OCCCNCC(C)(C)C(N)=O)ccc1Cc1c(O[C@@H]2O[C@H](CO)[C@@H](O)[C@H](O)[C@H]2O)n[nH]c1C(C)C
- InChI: InChI=1S/C28H44N4O8/c1-15(2)21-19(25(32-31-21)40-26-24(36)23(35)22(34)20(13-33)39-26)12-17-7-8-18(11-16(17)3)38-10-6-9-30-14-28(4,5)27(29)37/h7-8,11,15,20,22-24,26,30,33-36H,6,9-10,12-14H2,1-5H3,(H2,29,37)(H,31,32)/t20-,22-,23+,24-,26+/m1/s1; Key:LREHMKLEOJAVMQ-TXKDOCKMSA-N

Mizagliflozin is an SGLT1 inhibitor developed as a potential treatment for chronic constipation. It progressed as far as Phase II trials in humans but was not approved for medical use, however it has since been investigated for other applications.
