= Dihydrofolate reductase inhibitor =

Cellular enzyme inhibitor

A dihydrofolate reductase inhibitor (DHFR inhibitor) is a molecule that inhibits the function of dihydrofolate reductase, and is a type of antifolate.

Since folate is needed by rapidly dividing cells to make thymine, this effect may be used to therapeutic advantage. For example, methotrexate is used as cancer chemotherapy because it can prevent neoplastic cells from dividing. Bacteria also need DHFR to grow and multiply and hence inhibitors selective for bacterial vs. host DHFR have found application as antibacterial agents.

Tetrahydrofolate synthesis pathway

Classes of small-molecules employed as inhibitors of dihydrofolate reductase include diaminoquinazoline and diaminopyrroloquinazoline, Most of the above specified inhibitors are structural analogues of the substrate dihydrofolate and bind to the active site of the enzyme. Further, it has been recently shown that, in E. coli DHFR, allosteric site binders can inhibit the enzyme either uncompetitively or non-competitively. The examples provided below are specific molecules belonging to one of the above-mentioned classes.

- the experimental antimalarial and anti-toxoplasmosis compound JPC-2056
- Oral piritrexim, a treatment for metastatic urothelial cancer.
- Cycloguanil, a metabolite of proguanil (a component of the oral antimalarial atovaquone-proguanil, or Malarone), although this has been called into question (see its article)
- Methotrexate/amethopterin and its novel analogues pemetrexed, edatrexate, pralatrexate, nolatrexed, raltitrexed, phototrexate
- Triazinate, Aminopterin, Denopterin, DDPO, TNP-351, PD130883, OYYF-175, sodium para-aminosalicylic acid dihydrate
- Trimethoprim, pyrimethamine, trimetrexate, tetroxoprim, aditoprim, iclaprim, fanotaprim, clociguanil, epiroprim, metioprim, Diaveridine/EGIS-5645, WR99210 are antimicrobials.
- Talotrexin monoammonium, chlorasquin, fluorofolin, mobiletrex
