= C4H6N4 =

The molecular formula C_{4}H_{6}N_{4} (molar mass: 110.12 g/mol, exact mass: 110.0592 u) may refer to:

- Diaminopyrimidines
  - 2,4-Diaminopyrimidine
  - 4,5-Diaminopyrimidine
