= Antimetabolite =

Chemical that inhibits the use of a metabolite

The drug methotrexate (bottom) is an antimetabolite that interferes with the metabolism of folic acid (top)

An antimetabolite is a chemical that inhibits the use of a metabolite, which is another chemical that is part of normal metabolism. Such substances are often similar in structure to the metabolite that they interfere with, such as the antifolates that interfere with the use of folic acid; thus, competitive inhibition can occur, and the presence of antimetabolites can have toxic effects on cells, such as halting cell growth and cell division, so these compounds are used in chemotherapy for cancer.

== Function ==
=== Cancer treatment ===
Antimetabolites can be used in cancer treatment, as they interfere with DNA production and therefore cell division and tumor growth. Because cancer cells spend more time dividing than other cells, inhibiting cell division harms tumor cells more than other cells. Antimetabolite drugs are commonly used to treat leukemia, cancers of the breast, ovary, and the gastrointestinal tract, as well as other types of cancers. In the Anatomical Therapeutic Chemical Classification System antimetabolite cancer drugs are classified under L01B.

Antimetabolites generally impair DNA replication machinery, either by incorporation of chemically altered nucleotides or by depleting the supply of deoxynucleotides needed for DNA replication and cell proliferation.

Examples of cancer drug antimetabolites include, but are not limited to the following:

- 5-Fluorouracil (5-FU)
- 6-Mercaptopurine (6-MP)
- Capecitabine (Xeloda)
- Cytarabine (Ara-C)
- Floxuridine
- Fludarabine
- Gemcitabine (Gemzar)
- Hydroxycarbamide
- Methotrexate
- Pemetrexed (Alimta)
- Phototrexate

Anti-metabolites masquerade as a purine (azathioprine, mercaptopurine) or a pyrimidine, chemicals that become the building-blocks of DNA. They prevent these substances from becoming incorporated into DNA during the S phase (of the cell cycle), stopping normal development and cell division. Anti-metabolites also affect RNA synthesis. However, because thymidine is used in DNA but not in RNA (where uracil is used instead), inhibition of thymidine synthesis via thymidylate synthase selectively inhibits DNA synthesis over RNA synthesis.

Due to their efficiency, these drugs are the most widely used cytostatics. Competition for the binding sites of enzymes that participate in essential biosynthetic processes and subsequent incorporation of these biomolecules into nucleic acids, inhibits their normal tumor cell function and triggers apoptosis, the cell death process. Because of this mode of action, most antimetabolites have high cell cycle specificity and can target arrest of cancer cell DNA replication.

Anthracyclines are anti-tumor antibiotics that interfere with enzymes involved in copying DNA during the cell cycle. These represent an alternative mode of cancer treatment, blocking tumour growth through non-mimetic mechanisms such as DNA intercalation or inducing damage to nucleic acids.

Examples of anthracyclines include:

- Daunorubicin
- Doxorubicin (Adriamycin)
- Epirubicin
- Idarubicin

Anti-tumor antibiotics that are not anthracyclines include:

- Actinomycin-D
- Bleomycin
- Mitomycin-C
- Mitoxantrone
- Phototrexate

=== Anti-bacterial antimetabolites ===
Some antimetabolites can also be antibiotics, such as sulfanilamide drugs, which inhibit dihydrofolate synthesis in bacteria by competing with para-aminobenzoic acid (PABA). PABA is needed in enzymatic reactions that produce folic acid, which acts as a coenzyme in the synthesis of purines and pyrimidines, the building-blocks of DNA. Mammals do not synthesize their own folic acid so they are unaffected by PABA inhibitors, which selectively kill bacteria.

=== Other uses ===
Antimetabolites, particularly mitomycin C (MMC), are commonly used in America and Japan as an addition to trabeculectomy, a surgical procedure to treat glaucoma.

Antimetabolites have been shown to decrease fibrosis of operative sites. Thus, its use following external dacryocystorhinostomy, a procedure for the management of nasolacrimal duct obstruction, is being researched.

Intraoperative antimetabolite application, namely mitomycin C (MMC) and 5-fluorouracil (5-FU), is currently being tested for its effectiveness of managing pterygium.

== Types ==
Main categories of these drugs include:

- base analogues (altered nucleobases) – structures that can substitute for a normal nucleobases in nucleic acids. This means that these molecules are structurally similar enough to the basic components of DNA that they can be substituted in. However, since they are slightly different from the normal bases after they are incorporated into the DNA, the DNA production is halted and the cell dies.
  - purine analogues – mimic the structure of metabolic purines, the larger bases incorporated into DNA as adenosine and guanosine.
    - Examples: Azathioprine, Thiopurines, and Fludarabine
  - pyrimidine analogues – mimic the structure of metabolic pyrimidines, the smaller bases incorporated into DNA as cytosine and thymine.
    - Examples: 5-Fluorouracil, Gemcitabine, and Cytarabine
- nucleoside analogues – nucleoside alternatives that consist of a nucleic acid analogue and a sugar. This means these are the same bases as above, but with an added sugar group. For the nucleoside analogues either the base or the sugar component can be altered. They are similar enough to the molecules used to build cellular DNA that they are incorporated by the cell into its DNA, but different enough that after being added the cell's DNA they stop cell growth.
- nucleotide analogues – nucleotides alternatives that consist of a nucleic acid, a sugar, and 1–3 phosphates. This means these molecules are similar to the pieces used to build DNA in a cell and can be incorporated into a growing cell's DNA. However, because they are analogues and therefore slightly different from regular nucleotides, causing the cell's growth to be halted and the cell to die.
- antifolates – chemicals that block the actions of folic acid (vitamin B9) which is needed to build DNA and allow cells to grow.

== See also ==
- Antinutrient
