= Biguanide =

Chemical compound

- Skeletal formula of biguanide

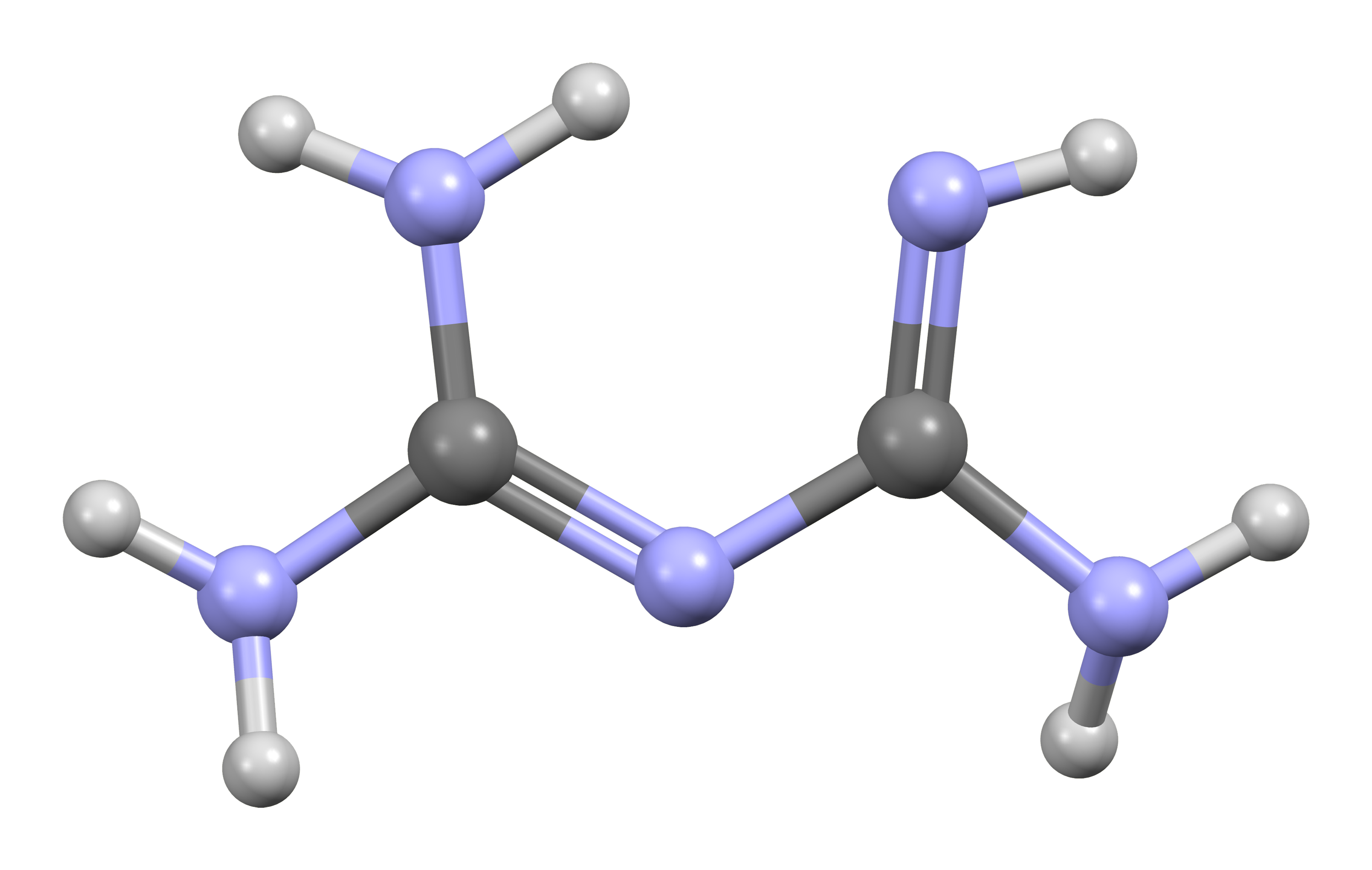
- Ball and stick model of biguanide

Names
- Preferred IUPAC name Imidodicarbonimidic diamide

Identifiers
CAS Number	56-03-1
3D model (JSmol)	Interactive image
Beilstein Reference	507183
ChEBI	CHEBI:3095
ChemSpider	5726
ECHA InfoCard	100.000.229
EC Number	200-251-8
Gmelin Reference	240093
KEGG	C07672
PubChem CID	5939
UNII	FB4Q52I9K2
CompTox Dashboard (EPA)	DTXSID7074664
- InChI: InChI=1S/C2H7N5/c3-1(4)7-2(5)6/h(H7,3,4,5,6,7) Key: XNCOSPRUTUOJCJ-UHFFFAOYSA-N
- SMILES: N=C(N)NC(=N)N

Properties
Chemical formula	C_{2}H_{7}N_{5}
Molar mass	101.113 g·mol^{−1}
Melting point	130 °C (266 °F; 403 K)
Boiling point	142 °C (288 °F; 415 K) (decomp.)
Acidity (pK_{a})	3.07, 13.25
- Except where otherwise noted, data are given for materials in their standard state (at 25 °C [77 °F], 100 kPa). verify (what is ?) Infobox references

Biguanide (/baɪˈɡwɒnaɪd/) is the organic compound with the formula HN(C(NH)NH_{2})_{2}. It is a colorless solid that dissolves in water to give a highly basic solution. These solutions slowly hydrolyse to ammonia and urea.

== Synthesis ==
Biguanide can be obtained from the reaction of dicyandiamide with ammonia, via a Pinner-type process.

$$\mathrm{C_2H_4N_4 + NH_3 \longrightarrow C_2H_7N_5}$$

Biguanide was first synthesized by Bernhard Rathke in 1879.

== Biguanidine drugs ==
A variety of derivatives of biguanide are used as pharmaceutical drugs.

=== Antihyperglycemic agents ===
The term "biguanidine" often refers specifically to a class of drugs that function as oral antihyperglycemic drugs used for diabetes mellitus or prediabetes treatment.

Examples include:

- Metformin - widely used in treatment of diabetes mellitus type 2
- Phenformin - withdrawn from the market in most countries due to toxic effects
- Buformin - withdrawn from the market due to toxic effects
bioactive biguanidines

Metformin, could be referred to as asymmetric dimethylbiguanidine

Buformin. A butyl derivative of biguanidine.

Phenformin. A phenethylated biguanidine.

==== History ====
Galega officinalis (French lilac) was used in diabetes treatment for centuries. In the 1920s, guanidine compounds were discovered in Galega extracts. Animal studies showed that these compounds lowered blood glucose levels. Some less toxic derivatives, synthalin A and synthalin B, were used for diabetes treatment, but after the discovery of insulin, their use declined. Biguanides were reintroduced into Type 2 diabetes treatment in the late 1950s. Initially phenformin was widely used, but its potential for sometimes fatal lactic acidosis resulted in its withdrawal from most pharmacopeias (in the U.S. in 1978). Metformin has a much better safety profile, and it is the principal biguanide drug used in pharmacotherapy worldwide.

==== Mechanism of action ====
The mechanism of action of biguanides is not fully understood, and many mechanisms have been proposed for metformin.

Biguanides do not affect the output of insulin, unlike other hypoglycemic agents such as sulfonylureas and meglitinides. Therefore, they are effective in Type 2 diabetics; and in Type 1 diabetes when used in conjunction with insulin therapy.

Mainly used in Type II diabetes, metformin is considered to increase insulin sensitivity in vivo, resulting in reduced plasma glucose concentrations, increased glucose uptake, and decreased gluconeogenesis.

However, in hyperinsulinemia, biguanides can lower fasting levels of insulin in plasma. Their therapeutic uses derive from their tendency to reduce gluconeogenesis in the liver, and, as a result, reduce the level of glucose in the blood. Biguanides also tend to make the cells of the body more willing to absorb glucose already present in the bloodstream, and there again reducing the level of glucose in the plasma.

Biguanides have been shown to interact with copper, specifically in mitochondria, where they interfere with cell metabolism by chelating Copper in its 2+ oxidation state (Cu(II)).

==== Side effects and toxicity ====
The most common side effect is diarrhea and dyspepsia, occurring in up to 30% of patients. The most important and serious side effect is lactic acidosis, therefore metformin is contraindicated in advanced chronic kidney disease. Kidney function should be assessed before starting metformin. Phenformin and buformin are more prone to cause acidosis than metformin; therefore they have been practically replaced by it. However, when metformin is combined with other drugs (combination therapy), hypoglycemia and other side effects are possible.

=== Antimalarial ===
During WWII a British team led by Frank Rose discovered (see details there) that some biguanides are useful as antimalarial drugs. Much later it was demonstrated that they are prodrugs metabolised into active dihydrotriazine derivatives which, until recently, were believed to work by inhibiting dihydrofolate reductase. Examples include:

- Proguanil (>cycloguanil)
- Chlorproguanil

=== Disinfectants ===
The disinfectants chlorhexidine, polyaminopropyl biguanide (PAPB), polihexanide, and alexidine feature biguanide functional groups.
