= Meenhard Herlyn =

American medical researcher

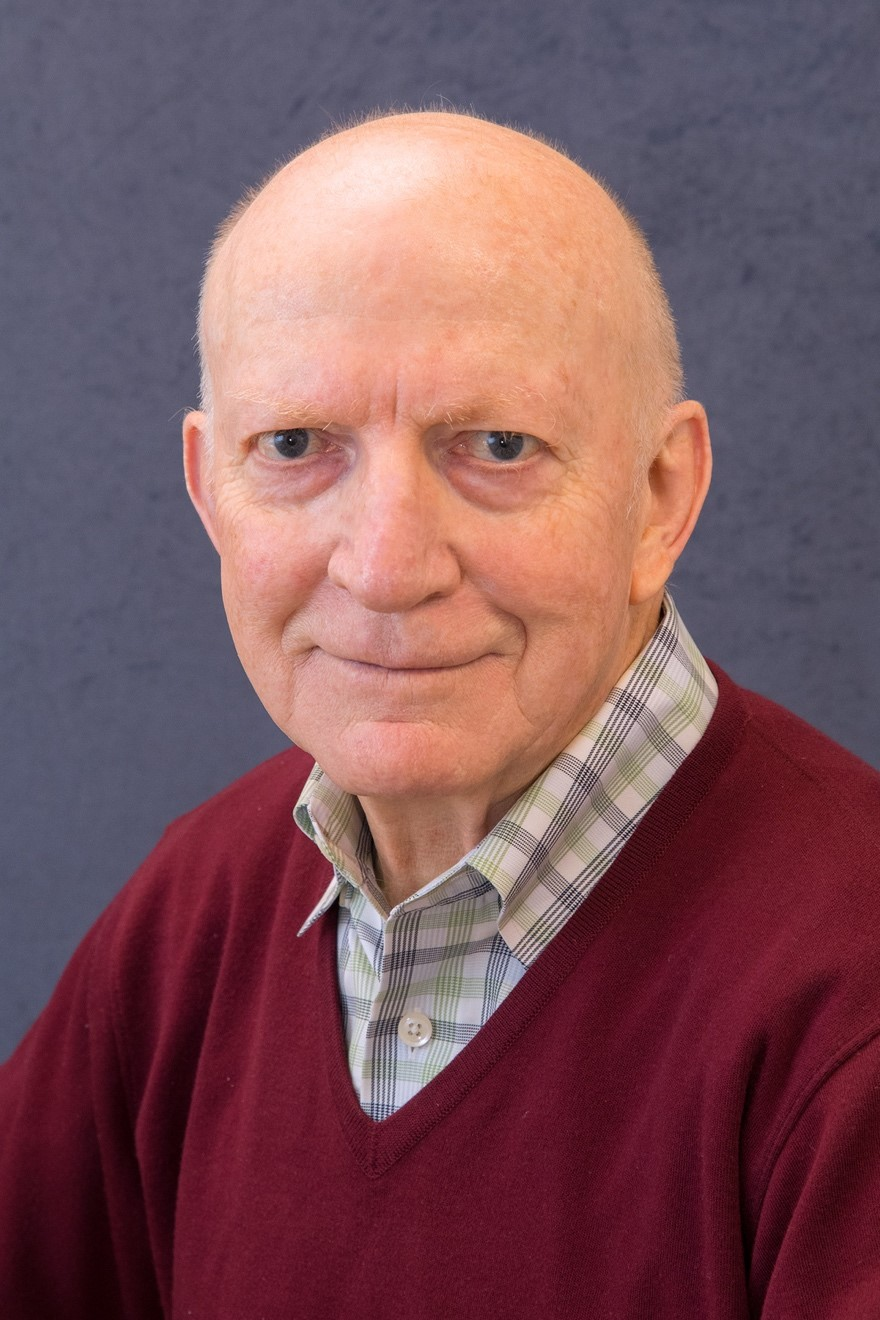
Undated photo

Meenhard Herlyn is an American researcher who works as director of the Wistar Institute Melanoma Research in Philadelphia. Herlyn obtained his D.V.M. degree from the University of Veterinary Medicine Hannover in 1970. Following that, in 1976, he earned a D.Sc. in medical microbiology from LMU Munich. In 1976, he joined the Wistar Institute as an associate scientist, focusing on the emerging field of monoclonal antibodies—a groundbreaking technology that now underlies a significant portion of targeted therapeutics. Transitioning to the role of assistant professor in 1981, Herlyn established a renowned laboratory dedicated to studying melanoma biology, which remains highly regarded in the field to this day. His primary research focus is the underlying biology behind melanoma, the most aggressive form of skin cancer. Over the course of his career, he has been responsible for the use of three-dimensional artificial skin cultures to study tumor and normal cells, a clearer understanding of stem cells and how they relate to cancer, and signaling pathways related to cancer. The Wistar Melanoma (WM) cell lines that Herlyn has used and helped discover in his laboratory are responsible for a better understanding of the major steps of tumor progression in human cases of melanoma.

In 2003, Herlyn helped launch the first International Melanoma Research Congress in Philadelphia, the first scientific meeting specifically aimed at melanoma scientists. This was done in collaboration with the Foundation for Melanoma Research. This collaboration was prompted with his first direct melanoma patient interaction after more than two decades of research on the disease. He also established the Society for Melanoma Research in 2004 and served as its president for three years.

One of the more recent discoveries made by Herlyn's lab found that the diabetes drug phenformin could be used to treat certain slow-growing, drug-resistant tumor cells in melanoma. In December 2013, it was announced that Herlyn and his colleagues had received a five-year, $12.5 million program project grant (PO1) to continue research on melanoma from multiple angles. In May 2013, L'Oréal Paris announced that Herlyn would lead the Melanoma Research Alliance Team Science Award, which provides more than $750,000 over three years to research the prevention, treatment, and potential cures for melanoma.

He is a member of the editorial board of the Cancer and Metastasis Reviews.

== Select publications ==
- Balaburski, G.M., Leu, J.I., Beeharry, N., Hayik, S., Andrake, M.D., Zhang, G., Herlyn, M., Villanueva, J., Dunbrack, R.L., Yen, T., George, D.L., Murphy, M.E.: A modified HSP70 inhibitor shows broad activity as an anticancer agent. Mol. Cancer Res. 11:219-229, 2013.
- Krepler, C., Chunduru, S.K., Halloran, M.B., He, X., Xiao, M., Vultur, A., Villanueva, J., Mitsuuchi, Y., Neiman, E.M., Benetatos, C., Nathanson, K.L., Amaravadi, R.K., Pehamberger, H., McKinlay, M., and Herlyn, M.: The novel SMAC inhibitor birinapant exhibits potent activity against human melanoma cells. Clin. Cancer Res. 19: 1784-1794, 2013.
- Desai, B.M., Villanueva, J., Nguyen, T-T.K., Lioni, M., Xiao, M., Kong, J., Krepler, C., Vultur, A., Flaherty, K.T., Nathanson, K.L., Smalley, K.S.M., Herlyn, M.: The anti-melanoma activity of dinaciclib, a cyclin-dependent kinase inhibitor, is dependent on p53 signaling. PLoS One, 8(3):e59588 doi:10:1371/journal.pone.0059588, 2013.
- Vultur, A., Villanueva, J., Krepler, C., Rajan, G., Chen, Q., Li, L., Gimotty, P., Wilson, M., Hayden, J., Keeney, F., Nathanson, K.L., Herlyn, M. MEK inhibition affects STAT3 signaling and invasion in human melanoma cell lines. Oncogene April 29 [Epub ahead of print], 2013.
- Aird, K.M., Zhang, G., Li, H., Tu, Z., Bitler, B.G., Garipov, A., Wu, H., Wei, Z., Wagner, S.N., Herlyn, M., Zhang, R. Suppression of nucleotide metabolism underlies the establishment and maintenance of oncogene-induced senescence. Cell Rep. 3:1-4, 2013.
