= Diaminopyrimidine =

Class of organic chemical compounds

Diaminopyrimidines (DAP) are a class of organic chemical compounds that include two amine groups on a pyrimidine ring.

Iclaprim

Trimethoprim

They include many dihydrofolate reductase inhibitor drugs (such as pyrimethamine, trimetrexate, and piritrexim and the antibiotics iclaprim and trimethoprim).

Some have been patented as anti-cancer drugs.

== See also ==
- 2,4-Diaminopyrimidine
- 4,5-Diaminopyrimidine
