= Bisbiguanide =

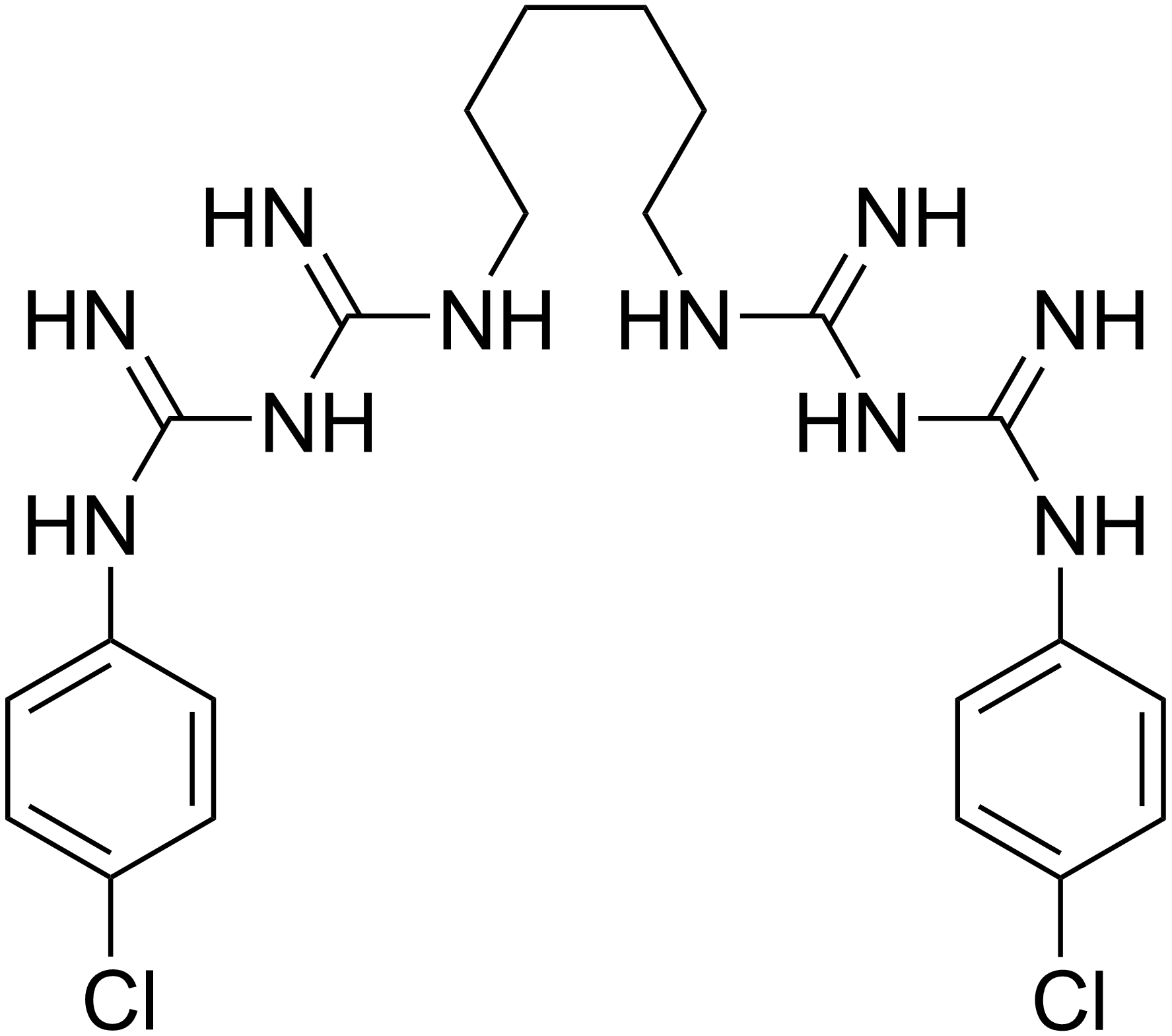
Structure of chlorhexidine, a bisbiguanide antiseptic.

Bisbiguanides are a class of chemically related compounds known for their bactericidal properties. Generally considered to be of the generic formula: R^{1} R^{2} N.C(:NR^{6})NH.C(:NH)NH.CH_{2} X--(CH_{2})_{3} NH.C(:NH)NH.C(:NR^{7})NR^{3} R^{4}. These compounds include the antiseptics chlorhexidine and alexidine. They are named for having two biguanide moieties, which themselves are named for having two guanide parts.
