= Frank Rose (chemist) =

British chemist

Francis Leslie Rose CBE FRS (27 June 1909 – 3 March 1988) was a British chemist.

Francis Leslie Rose (always known as Frank Rose) was born in Lincoln on 27 June 1909, the second son of Frederick Will Rose, a clerk to a firm of solicitors in Lincoln, and Elisabeth Ann (née Watts). Coming from a family with many church choristers, he taught himself to play the piano, and soon became “accompanist in chief”. He joined the choir of St Martin's Church, Lincoln at age 6, and also taught himself to play the organ. Rose was later to be appointed organist and choirmaster at Ruskington before going up to university.

== Education ==
Rose attended St Faith’s Primary School and Christ’s Hospital Continuation School before gaining a scholarship at age 9 to Lincoln City School. He was much influenced by the senior chemistry master there. At age 16 he was interviewed by Professor Frederic Kipping, FRS at Nottingham, and offered a place in two years’ time. He gained a first class degree, largely thanks to the quality of Kipping’s teaching.

== Scientific career ==
Rose stayed on at Nottingham for his PhD, during which time he attracted the attention of the Dyestuffs Division of ICI. They wanted new types of intermediate for direct azo dyes, a problem which Rose solved in 1932 with a method suitable for large scale manufacture. This success led to his being recruited that year by ICI. Four years later the management decided that they would enter the pharmaceuticals field, and Rose was to be part of the group. “From that time until his death 52 years later Rose was entirely consumed by his love for the biological activity of chemicals.” In the new Medical Chemicals Section of the ICI (later Pharmaceuticals Division, which ended up demerged into Zeneca) at Blackley he was joined by Frank Curd and other dyestuff chemists.

The initial task was to find a patentable analog of Prontosil, which was in turn developed by Bayer as a patentable prodrug of sulfonamide, and Rose developed sulphamezathine. After the start of WWII Rose's section was tasked to manufacture drugs made exclusively in Germany (like was made during WWI with arsphenamine), including antimalarial medications pamaquine and mepacrine, with a great success. When the Japanese attack on Pearl Harbor started World War II in the Pacific, the US became much more interested in antimalarials and funded a large joint US-UK program to find new non-toxic and easy to produce drugs of the type, which was joined by the ICI team including Rose, Curd and two newly recruited scientists Garnet Davey and Alfred Spinks.

Rose and Curd decided to concentrate on pyrimidines as relatively simple to synthetise, even though the Advisory Panel recommended against that because most antimalarials by then were either quinolines or acridines. Checking prospective 2,4-diaminopyridine derivatives with a basic side chain and a benzenoid moiety one after another, they noticed a geometric pattern in the effective analogs and wondered if they could reproduce their interesting biologic activity with molecules even simpler, without the pyrimidine ring, and tried biguanides (then called diguanides) with which Rose was familiar due to his earlier sulphonamide research to great effect. As a result, in 1945 ICI introduced paludrine, and only much later it was found that an oxidative cyclization of this prodrug led to the active dihydrotriazine derivative cycloguanil (the mechanism of its work is still debated).

He was elected a Fellow of the Royal Society in 1957 when his candidacy citation read:

Distinguished for his researches in organic chemistry with particular reference to chemotherapy. As leader of the Medicinal Chemicals Section of Imperial Chemical Industries Ltd. (Dyestuffs Division) he, with his colleague, the late Dr. F.H.S. Curd, was responsible for the brilliant series of researches culminating in the discovery of the antimalarial drug paludrine, His contributions throughout have been marked by skill in experimentation and by the originality of his concepts of the relation between chemical structure and pharmacological action, concepts which have paved the way for his numerous successes in the field of chemotherapy, e.g. synthesis of paludrine, and of the trypanocide antrycide.

He won their Leverhulme Prize in 1975, and was made CBE in 1978. He was made an honorary DSc of Loughborough University in 1982.

== Family ==
Frank Rose first met his future wife, Ailsa Buckley, when they were both in Llandudno in 1930. They married in Lincoln in 1935. Their first child, Anne, died soon after birth in 1937. Their son, Peter, born four years later, turned out to be a good organist, but chose to become a geographer. Later, though, he moved to St John's College School and again became involved in cathedral music.

Francis Leslie Rose died in the town of his birth on 3 March 1988. His ashes are in the Garden of Remembrance at Macclesfield Crematorium. Ailsa died in 1999.
