= Photopharmacology =

Subdiscipline of medicine employing interaction of drugs with light for drug delivery

Photopharmacology is an emerging multidisciplinary field that combines photochemistry and pharmacology. Built upon the ability of light to change the pharmacokinetics and pharmacodynamics of bioactive molecules, it aims at regulating the activity of drugs in vivo by using light. The light-based modulation is achieved by incorporating molecular photoswitches such as azobenzene and diarylethenes or photocages such as o-nitrobenzyl, coumarin, and BODIPY compounds into the pharmacophore. This selective activation of the biomolecules helps prevent or minimize off-target activity and systemic side effects. Moreover, light being the regulatory element offers additional advantages such as the ability to be delivered with high spatiotemporal precision, low to negligible toxicity, and the ability to be controlled both qualitatively and quantitatively by tuning its wavelength and intensity.

== History ==
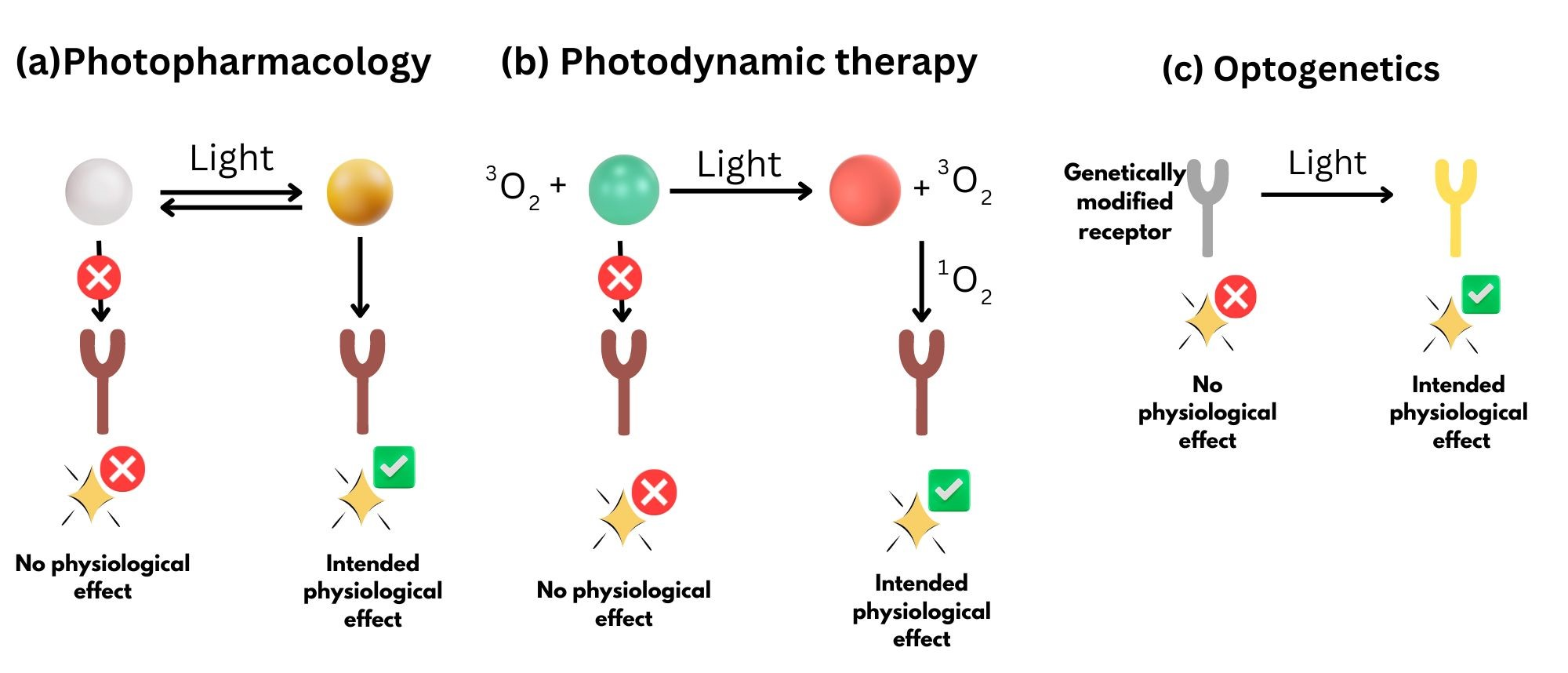
Though photopharmacology is a relatively new field, the concept of using light in therapeutic applications came into practice a few decades ago. Photodynamic therapy (PDT) is a well-established clinically practiced protocol in which photosensitizers are used to produce singlet oxygen for destroying diseased or damaged cells or tissues. Optogenetics is another method that relies on light for dynamically controlling biological functions especially brain and neural. Though this approach has proven useful as a research tool, its clinical implementation is limited by the requirement for genetic manipulation. Mainly, these two techniques laid the foundation for photopharmacology. Today, it is a rapidly evolving field with diverse applications in both basic research and clinical medicine which has the potential to overcome some of the challenges limiting the range of applications of the other light-guided therapies.

Figure 1. Schematic representation of the mechanism of (a) photopharmacology (b) photodynamic therapy, and (c) optogenetics.

The discovery of natural photoreceptors such as rhodopsins in the eye inspired the biomedical and pharmacology research community to engineer light-sensitive proteins for therapeutic applications. The development of synthetic photoswitchable molecules is the most significant milestone in the history of light-delivery systems. Scientists are continuing with their efforts to explore new photoswitches and delivery strategies with enhanced performance to target different biological molecules such as ion channels, nucleic acid, and enzyme receptors. Photopharmacology research progressed from in vitro to in vivo studies in a significantly short period of time yielding promising results in both forms. Clinical trials are underway to assess the safety and efficacy of these photopharmacological therapies further and validate their potential as an innovative drug delivery approach.

== Mechanism of action ==
Molecular photoswitches are utilized in the field of photopharmacology, where the energetics of a molecule can be reversibly controlled with light to achieve spatial and temporal resolution of a particular effect. Photoswitches may function by undergoing photoisomerization through which light is used to conformationally adapt a molecule to a biological site, or through an environmental effect where an external factor such as a solvent effect or hydrogen bonding can selectively allow or quench an emissive state within a molecule. To visualize photophysical processes, a useful depiction is the Jablonski diagram. This is a diagram which depicts electronic and vibrational energy levels within a molecule as vertical levels and shows the possible relaxation pathways from excited states. Typically, the ground state is referred to as S_{0}, and is drawn at the bottom of the figure with nearby vibrational excitations just above it. An absorption will promote an electron into the S_{1} state at any vibrational energy level, or into a higher order excited state if the absorbed energy has enough magnitude. The excited state can then undergo internal conversion which is the electronic relaxation to a lower state with the same vibrational energetics or vibrational relaxation within a state. This may be followed by an intersystem crossing wherein the electron undergoes a spin flip, or a radiative or nonradiative decay back to the ground state.

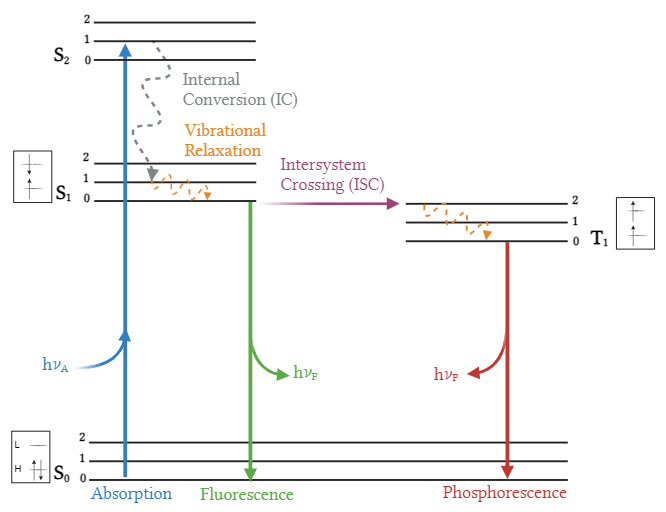
Figure 2. A representative Jablonski diagram.

One example of an organic compound that undergoes photoisomerization is azobenzene. The structure is two phenyl rings joined with a N=N double bond and is the simplest aryl azo compound. Azobenzene and its derivatives have two accessible absorbance bands: the S_{1} state from a n-π* transition which can be excited into using blue light, and the S_{2} state from a π-π* transition that can be excited into using ultraviolet light. Azobenzene and its derivatives have two isomers, trans and cis. The trans isomer, having the phenyl rings on opposite sides of the azo double bond, is the thermally preferred isomer as there is less stereoelectronic distortion and more delocalization present. However, excitation of the trans isomer to the S_{2} state facilitates a shift to the cis isomer. The S_{1} absorption is associated with a conversion back to the trans isomer. In this way, azobenzene and its derivatives can act as reversible stores of energy by maintaining a strained configuration in the cis isomer. Modifications of the substituents on azobenzene allow the energetics of these absorptions to be tuned, and if they are engineered such that the two absorption bands overlap a single wavelength of light can be used to flip between them. There are a number of similar photoswitches which isomerize between E and Z configurations across an azo group (for instance, azobenzene and azopyrazole) or an ethylene bridge (for instance, stilbene and hemithioindigo).

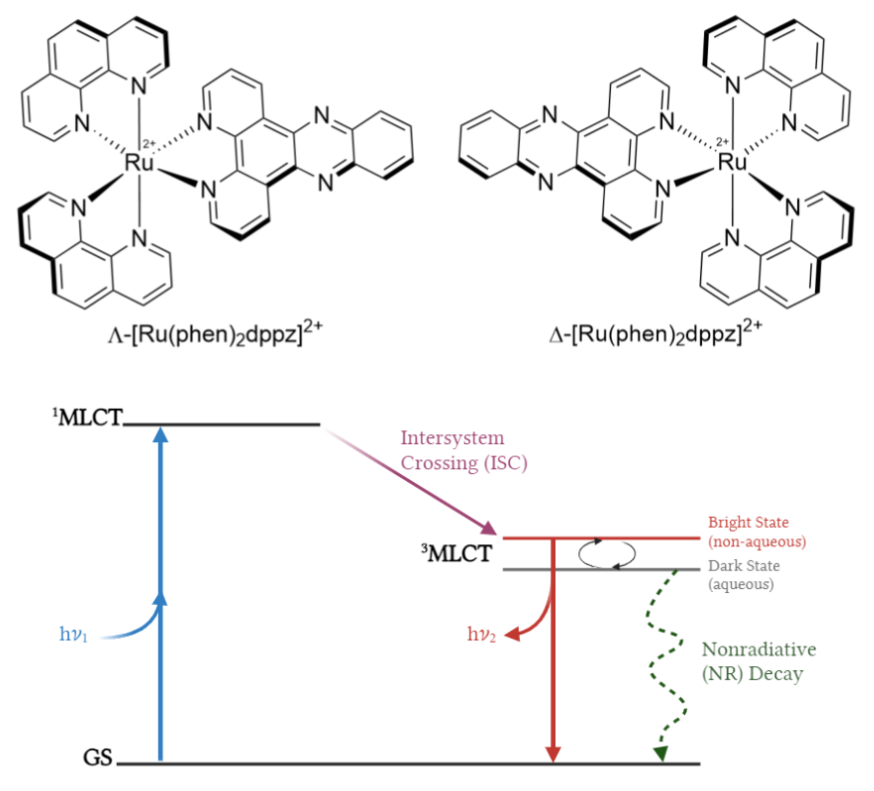
Figure 3. Top: renditions of the Λ and Δ enantiomers of [Ru(phen)_{2}dppz]^{2+}, where phen=1,10-phenanthroline and dppz=dipyrido[3,2-a:2,3-c]phenazine. Bottom: Jablonski diagram representing the aqueous quenching of [[Ru(phen)_{2}dppz]^{2+} emission, depicting bright states and dark states.]]

Alternatively, photoswitches may themselves be emissive and exhibit environmental control over their properties. One such example is a class of ruthenium polypyridyl coordination complexes. Typically they contain two bidentate bipyridine or phenanthroline ligands and an extended phenanthroline-phenazine bidentate ligand such as dipyrido[3,2-a:2,3-c]phenazine (dppz). These complexes have an accessible metal to ligand charge transfer excited state (^{1}MLCT) which undergoes rapid intersystem crossing to a ^{3}MLCT state due to the strong spin-orbit coupling of the ruthenium center. These excited states are localized on the extended ligand phenazine nitrogens, and emission occurs from the ^{3}MLCT state. Hydrogen bonding interactions such as the presence of water around these nitrogen atoms stabilizes the ^{3}MLCT state, quenching the emission process. Thus, by controlling whether an aqueous or otherwise protic polar solvent is present, emissive behaviors can be "turned on/off", and alternation between "bright states" and "dark states" is facilitated. This light switch behavior makes these and similar complexes of recent interest in photopharmacological applications such as photodynamic therapy.

== Molecules ==
As previously mentioned, photopharmacology relies on the use of molecular photoswitches being incorporated into the structure of biologically active molecules which allows their potency to be controlled optically. They are introduced into the structure of bioactive compounds via insertion, extension, or bioisosteric replacement. These incorporations can be supported by structural considerations of the molecule or SAR (structure-activity relationship) analysis to determine the optimal position. Some examples of photoswitchable molecules commonly used in photopharmacology are azobenzenes, diarylethenes, and photocages.

=== Azobenzenes ===
Azobenzenes are a class of photoswitchable molecules and are used in photopharmalogical applications for their reversible photoisomerization, as described in the previous section. An example of a photoswitchable molecule that uses azobenzene is phototrexate. Phototrexate is an inhibitor of human dihydrofolate reductase and is an analogue of methotrexate, a chemotherapy agent. When in its photoactive cis form, phototrexate has been shown to be a potent antifolate and is relatively inactive when in the trans form. The azologization, or incorporation of azobenzene, of methotrexate allows for control of cytotoxic activity and is considered a step forward in developing targeted anticancer drugs with localized efficacy.

=== Diarylethenes ===
Diarylethene photoswitches have reversible cyclization and cycloreversion reactions that are photoinduced. They are a class of compounds that have aromatic functional groups bonded to each end of a carbon-carbon double bond. An example of this class of molecule that is used in photopharmacology is stilbene. Under the influence of light, stilbene switches between its two isomers (E and Z).

Figure 4. Figure showing stilbene isomerizations under light from E to Z.

Diarylethenes have been shown to have some advantages over the more researched azobenzenes switches, such as thermal irreversibility, high photoswitching efficiency, favorable cellular stability, and low toxicity. Diarylethenes have been shown to have promise in fields other than photopharmacology as well. These fields include optical data storage, optoelectronic devices, supramolecular self-assembly and anti-counterfeiting.

=== Donor-acceptor Stenhouse adducts (DASAs) ===
DASAs are a relatively new class of molecular photoswitches (invented in 2014) that unlike conventional compounds requiring UV light, are characterized by activation by visible and near-infrared light and negative photochromism. Negative or T-type photoswitches are colored in their stable state and become colorless (less absorbing) upon light irradiation, which allows photoisomerization to propagate deep in a material or tissue. Their complex mechanism of isomerization (cyclization from a linear, polar, colored form to a non-polar, colorless, closed-ring form) has been studied in detail. Their application to photopharmacology in aqueous solution has been explored recently.

=== Photocages ===
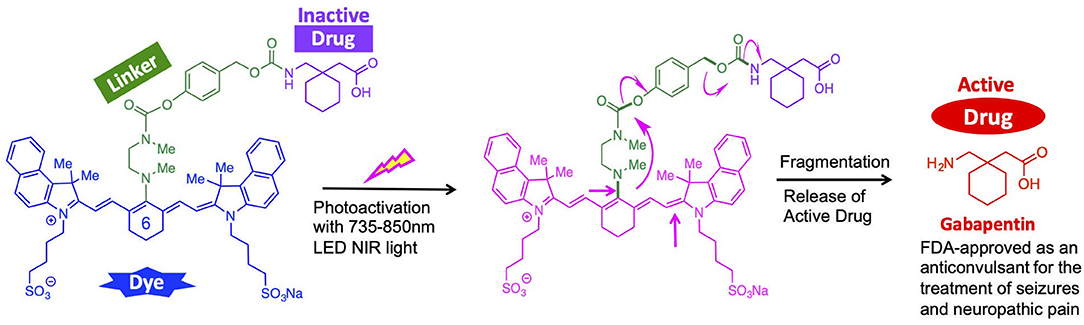
A class of substances known as photocages contain "photosensitive groups, also known as 'photoremovable protecting groups", from which target substances are released upon exposure to specific wavelengths of light". The photosensitive groups physically and chemically protect the target from being released until the molecule undergoes photoreaction. Due to these interactions with light, they are commonly used molecules in photopharmacology. More recently, they have played an important role in photoactivated chemotherapy (PACT). In PACT, photocages utilize a photoremovable protecting group that protects cytotoxic drugs until the bond is cleaved via light interaction and the cytotoxic drug is released. Some well-known photocages include "o-nitrobenzyl derivatives, coumarin derivatives, BODIPY, xanthene derivatives, quinone and diarylenes derivatives". However, there are limitations with using photocages in clinical applications as there are not many PPGs that can be used in vivo. This is due to PPG-payload conjugates needing to have acceptable solubility and biological inertness for biocompatibility and the need for efficient uncaging above 600 nm.

Figure 5. Example of a photocage release system activated by NIR.

== Application ==
Photopharmacology, the use of light to control the activity of drugs, has emerged as a promising approach to drug delivery and therapy. By harnessing the power of light, researchers can achieve precise control over drug release and activation, offering new possibilities for targeted and personalized treatments. This subsection explores the application of photopharmacology in drug delivery, focusing on recent advancements and potential clinical applications.

In one study, researchers designed HDAC inhibitors which can be activated or deactivated with light, providing precise therapeutic control. This approach could reduce the side effects of traditional chemotherapy by targeting inhibitors to specific body areas, potentially leading to more effective and personalized cancer treatments.

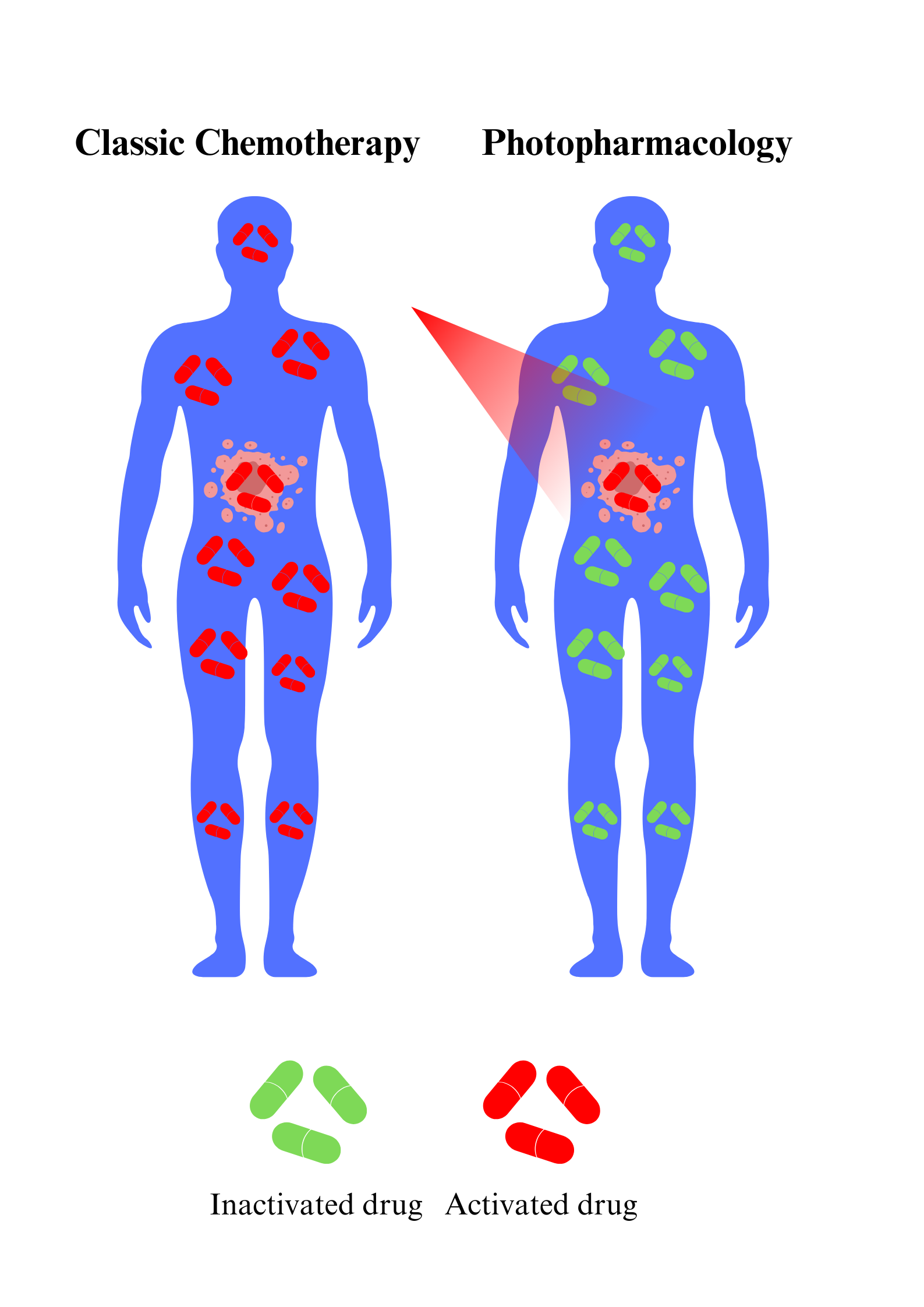
Figure 6. Comparison of the principles behind classic chemotherapy and photopharmacological chemotherapy.

In another study, the researchers developed a strategy to attach a photoswitchable group to a common antibiotic; ciprofloxacin. By attaching the photoswitchable group, researchers can control the activity of ciprofloxacin with light. This approach could potentially lead to new ways of treating bacterial infections, with the ability to switch the antibiotic's activity on and off as needed. In this paper an in vitro protocol to test different light wavelengths on human cancer cell lines is developed, finding that blue light most effectively inhibited cell growth. This suggests that photopharmacology could offer new cancer treatment options by targeting specific light wavelengths to modulate drug activity in tumor cells.

Another application of photopharmacology is developing a luminescent photoCORM grafted on carboxymethyl chitosan, which, when exposed to light, releases carbon monoxide (CO) to induce apoptotic death in colorectal cancer cells, demonstrating precise control over CO release for targeted cancer therapy.

Researchers developed a toolbox of photoswitchable antagonists that can interact with GPCRs, a class of proteins involved in various cellular processes. By using light to switch the activity of these antagonists, researchers can control the interaction between the antagonists and GPCRs in real time. This approach allows for precise modulation of GPCR activity, which could lead to new insights into cellular signaling pathways and potential therapeutic applications. For example, photoswitchable agonists-positive allosteric modulators of mGlu_{6} receptors ('prosthe6') allow restoring vision in animal models of retinal degeneration.

Photopharmacology has also been applied to the optical control of neurotransmitter systems. In the cholinergic system, photocaged and photoswitchable modulators of muscarinic and nicotinic acetylcholine receptors, as well as light-regulated cholinesterase inhibitors, have been developed to investigate cholinergic signaling. Related approaches to dopaminergic neurotransmission include caged dopamine derivatives and photoswitchable dopamine receptor ligands, which enable the study of receptor function and neural circuits with spatial and temporal precision. Although these compounds are currently used mainly as experimental tools, they have also been investigated as possible approaches to disorders involving cholinergic or dopaminergic dysfunction.

In another application by using light to control the assembly of nanopores, researchers can potentially regulate the flow of ions or molecules through these nanopores. This approach could have applications in various fields, including sensing, drug delivery, and nanotechnology.

Another paper reports on the use of photopharmacology to control drug activity; multifunctional fibers in the study deliver light and drugs to specific body areas. Implanted fibers activate light-responsive drugs, altering their structure, and offering precise drug delivery for conditions needing exact timing or dosage.

In another study, ligands were designed to switch their binding mode to G-quadruplex DNA upon exposure to visible light. This method could potentially modulate the activity of G-quadruplex DNA, crucial in gene expression and telomere maintenance, offering new therapeutic avenues, particularly in cancer treatment. The study underscores photopharmacology's promise in targeting specific DNA structures, suggesting G-quadruplex DNA as a viable target for future photopharmacological interventions.

Another study developed photoactivatable antibody-photoCORM conjugates targeting human ovarian cancer cells, releasing CO upon light exposure to diminish cell viability. This approach offers precise cancer cell targeting while minimizing harm to healthy tissue, showcasing the potential of photopharmacology in cancer therapy.

In another paper, a photoactivatable compound that binds to and modulates the activity of the CRY1 protein, regulating the mammalian circadian clock, was developed. By using light to control the compound's activity, researchers can potentially treat circadian rhythm disorders and related health conditions by modulating the function of CRY1. Photopharmacology involves using light to control the activity of drugs.

In another application researchers used photopharmacology to control drug release and focus on a drug interacting with tubulin, visualizing its release in real time with time-resolved serial crystallography. This technique offers insights into drug-tubulin interactions and demonstrates the potential for designing drugs with precise actions.

A reversibly photoswitchable toxin has been obtained by late-stage synthetic modification of veratridine with azobenzene, and demonstrated to photocontrol the activity of neurons and cardiac tissue without genetic modifications.

Since photopharmacology allows to control the activity of endogenous proteins with light without requiring genetic modification, it is particularly amenable to acutely treat intact tissue. This is in contrast to optogenetics, which generally requires a period of exogenous protein overexpression after gene transfection or viral infection. Taking advantage of this fact, the photoswitchable muscarinic modulator Phthal Azobenzene Iperoxo (PAI) has allowed for the first time the photopharmacological control of human tissue (control of brain wave activity with light in acute human brain slices).

== Future directions ==
Photopharmacology can be applied to regenerative medicine, where photoswitches can be used to modulate the activity of signaling pathways for targeted tissue repair and regeneration.Additionally, photoswitches can be applied to oncology.

Photopharmacology will continue to grow and expand with the new discoveries and advances happening in other related fields such as synthetic chemistry, biology, nanotechnology, pharmacology, and bioengineering. While the potential of photopharmacology is vast, some challenges must be addressed to make it a clinical reality. One challenge is the development of stable and biocompatible photoswitches that are selective for their target receptors without cross-activity. It is particularly important that these photoswitchables have their absorbance bands fall within the wavelength range of 650 nm to 900 nm. Hence, optimum molecular designing of photoswitches is required to achieve the characteristics mentioned above and desired level of performance. At present, photopharmacology uses a rational drug design approach based on studying the structure-activity relationship, however, a phenotypic screening for photoswitchable drugs could also be beneficial.

In order to achieve good spatial-temporal control over drug activity there should be a significant difference between the activity of isomers. However, understanding the structural changes during the biological effects induced by photoswitching is limited. This scarcity of knowledge is also a challenge for the growth of this field, as it hampers the optimization of the activity and potency of the isomers to obtain the expected outcomes during applications. Micrometre resolution photoswitching in three dimensions has been achieved on endogenous receptors in acute brain slices and in individual synapses in vivo.

The biggest challenge in photopharmacology is finding appropriate and effective ways to deliver light to deep tissues in the body and tissues avoiding issues such as scattering and absorption. Various strategies have been attempted in this regard, one being the development of photoswitchable ligands that respond to deep-tissue penetrating wavelengths like red or infrared (IR) light. Photoswitching with continuous wavelength red and deep red light has been shown at 615-740 nm. Photoswitching with IR light has been demonstrated by two-photon excitation with femtosecond pulsed lasers (at wavelengths between 800 and 900 nm), three-photon excitation (at 1560 nm), triplet sensitization (at 850 nm), and upconversion luminescence (at 975 nm). In vivo IR photopharmacology has been demonstrated with two-photon and three-photon excitation, as well as with triplet sensitization. Moreover, some recent preclinical studies have spurred the development of wireless, compact or injectable, and remotely controllable devices capable of delivering light to neural tissues with minimal damage. There are novel optofluidic systems that can simultaneously regulate both drug delivery and light activity at specific sites. Although external delivery of light is the most preferred method, the use of internal exogenous light sources such as luminescent compounds where light would be delivered directly at the site of action. This could avoid the issues related to light penetration and also enhance the degree of selectivity. In addition, this creates the opportunity to use photopharmacology as a theranostic approach that combines targeted drug delivery and molecular imaging.
