= Atovaquone/proguanil =

Chemical compound

Combination of
- Atovaquone: Antimalarial medication
- Proguanil: Antimalarial medication

Clinical data
- Trade names: Malarone, Malanil, others
- AHFS/Drugs.com: Monograph
- License data: US DailyMed: Atovaquone_and_proguanil
- Pregnancy category: AU: B2
- Routes of administration: By mouth
- ATC code: P01BB51 (WHO)

Legal status
- Legal status: AU: S4 (Prescription only); UK: POM (Prescription only); US: ℞-only; In general: ℞ (Prescription only)

Identifiers
- CAS Number: 156879-69-5
- PubChem CID: 11954242
- ChemSpider: 21230364
- KEGG: D02472
- CompTox Dashboard (EPA): DTXSID90935554

Atovaquone/proguanil, sold under the brand name Malarone among others, is a fixed-dose combination medication used to treat and prevent malaria, including chloroquine-resistant malaria. It contains atovaquone and proguanil. It is not recommended for severe or complicated malaria. It is taken by mouth.

Common side effects include abdominal pain, vomiting, diarrhea, cough, and itchiness. Serious side effects may include anaphylaxis, Stevens–Johnson syndrome, hallucinations, and liver problems. Side effects are generally mild. It is unclear if use during pregnancy or breastfeeding is safe for the baby. It is not recommended to prevent malaria in those with poor kidney function. Atovaquone works by interfering with the function of mitochondria in malaria while proguanil blocks dihydrofolate reductase.

Atovaquone/proguanil was approved for medical use in the United States in 2000. It has been available as a generic medication since 2011.

== Medical uses ==
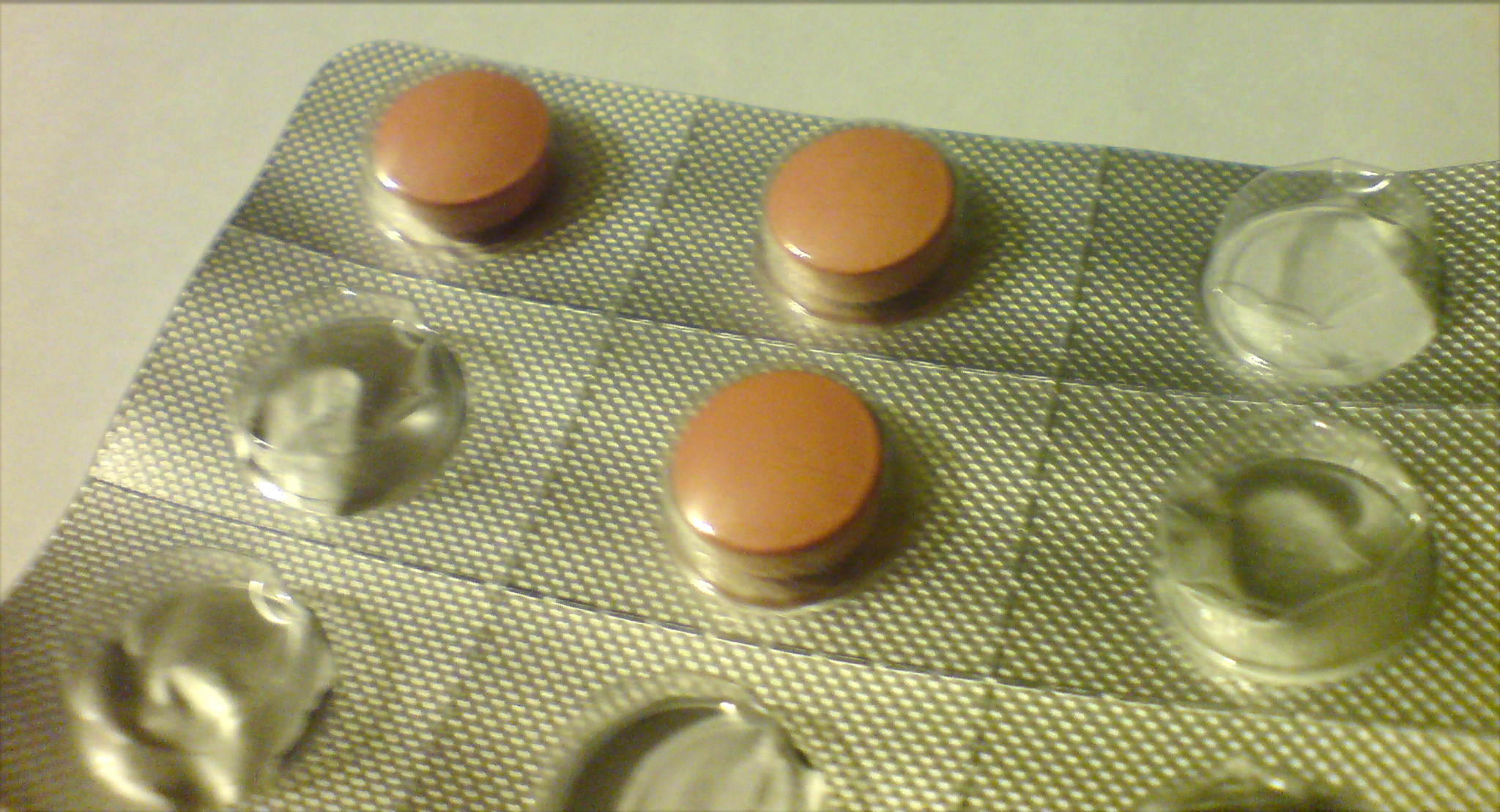
Malarone tablets as issued in the UK

=== Malaria treatment ===
Atovaquone/proguanil is not normally used to treat severe malaria, when an injectable drug such as quinine is used instead.

=== Malaria prevention ===
Since some malaria strains are resistant to atovaquone/proguanil, it is not effective in all parts of the world. It must be taken with a fatty meal, or at least some milk, for the body to absorb it adequately—and to avoid painful stomach irritation, which proguanil frequently causes if taken without food.

=== Resistance ===
Proguanil acts as a mitochondrial sensitiser and synergizes with atovaquone. When atovaquone is used as a sole agent, a high natural frequency of cytochrome b mutants leads to a high failure rate. This is potentially due to the high lipophilicity and slow uptake of atovaquone, which results in a relatively prolonged period of parasite exposure at ineffective concentrations. Specific mutations (Y268S, Y268C) have been shown to confer resistance in vivo, but the other mechanisms of resistance remain unknown.

== Adverse effects ==
Side effects are generally mild. While some people experience side effects, such as coughing, diarrhea, dizziness, headache, loss of appetite, mouth sores, nausea, stomach pain, vomiting, or weakness, the majority have none or few of these.

== Mechanism of action ==
Atovaquone selectively inhibits the malarial cytochrome bc_{1} complex in the parasitic electron transport chain, collapsing the mitochondrial membrane potential. The malarial electron transport chain does not contribute significantly to ATP synthesis; thus, it is believed that parasite death is due to the indirect inhibition of dihydroorotate dehydrogenase, which requires transport chain function and is essential to pyrimidine biosynthesis – a process required for DNA replication.

Proguanil, via its metabolite cycloguanil, functions as a dihydrofolate reductase inhibitor, halting parasitic deoxythymidylate synthesis.

=== Chemistry ===
A standard tablet of Malarone contains 100 mg of proguanil hydrochloride and 250 mg of atovaquone. A pediatric tablet contains 25 mg of proguanil hydrochloride and 62.5 mg of atovaquone.

== History ==
Glaxo Wellcome patented the combination of atovaquone and proguanil to treat malaria in 1999. Patent protection expired in 2013. The U.S. Food and Drug Administration (FDA) approved a generic formulation from Glenmark Generics in 2011. In February 2013, the United Kingdom High Court revoked Glaxo's patent on grounds of obviousness, which clears the way for firms to sell generic versions there.
