= Alexidine =

Names
- Preferred IUPAC name N^{1},N^{1′}-(Hexane-1,6-diyl)bis[N^{3}-(2-ethylhexyl)imidodicarbonic diamide]

Identifiers
| CAS Number | 22573-93-9 |
| 3D model (JSmol) | Interactive image |
| ChEBI | CHEBI:CHEBI:53661 |
| ChEMBL | ChEMBL1195210 |
| ChemSpider | 2006 |
| ECHA InfoCard | 100.040.981 |
| EC Number | 245-096-7 |
| KEGG | D02804 |
| PubChem CID | 2090 |
| UNII | GVN71CAL3G |
| CompTox Dashboard (EPA) | DTXSID4048482 |
- InChI: InChI=1S/C26H56N10/c1-5-9-15-21(7-3)19-33-25(29)35-23(27)31-17-13-11-12-14-18-32-24(28)36-26(30)34-20-22(8-4)16-10-6-2/h21-22H,5-20H2,1-4H3,(H5,27,29,31,33,35)(H5,28,30,32,34,36) Key: LFVVNPBBFUSSHL-UHFFFAOYSA-N; InChI=1/C26H56N10/c1-5-9-15-21(7-3)19-33-25(29)35-23(27)31-17-13-11-12-14-18-32-24(28)36-26(30)34-20-22(8-4)16-10-6-2/h21-22H,5-20H2,1-4H3,(H5,27,29,31,33,35)(H5,28,30,32,34,36) Key: LFVVNPBBFUSSHL-UHFFFAOYAY
- SMILES: CCCCC(C/N=C(/N=C(\NCCCCCCN/C(=N\C(=N\CC(CCCC)CC)\N)/N)/N)\N)CC

Properties
| Chemical formula | C_{26}H_{56}N_{10} |
| Molar mass | 508.804 g·mol^{−1} |
- Except where otherwise noted, data are given for materials in their standard state (at 25 °C [77 °F], 100 kPa). Infobox references

Alexidine is an antimicrobial of the biguanide class. More specifically, it is a bisbiguanide.
