= Atovaquone =

Antimicrobial and antiprotozoan drug

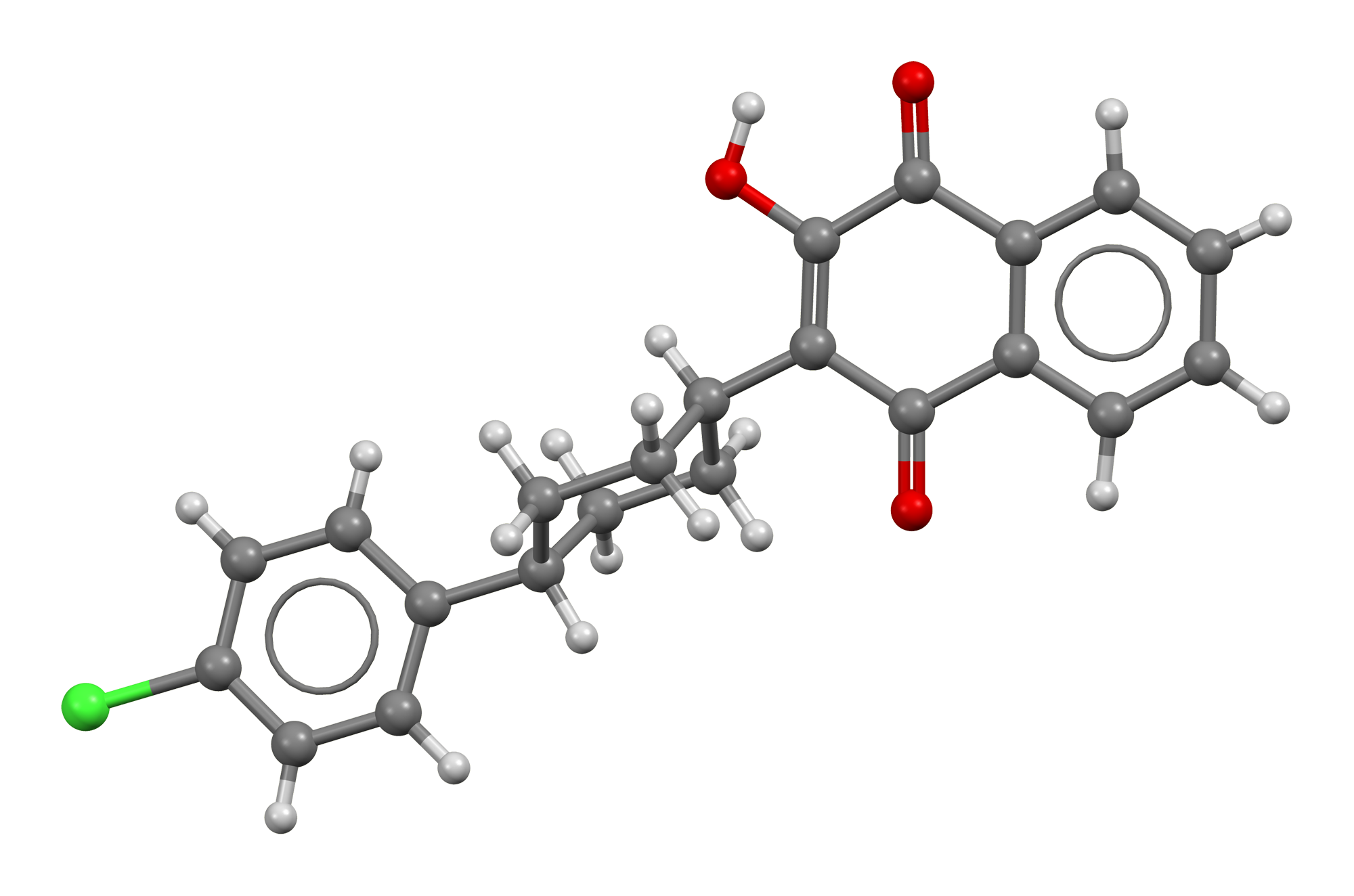

Clinical data
- Trade names: Mepron
- AHFS/Drugs.com: Monograph
- MedlinePlus: a693003
- Routes of administration: By mouth
- ATC code: P01AX06 (WHO)

Legal status
- Legal status: UK: POM (Prescription only); US: ℞-only

Pharmacokinetic data
- Elimination half-life: 2.2–3.2 days

Identifiers
- IUPAC name: trans-2-[4-(4-Chlorophenyl)cyclohexyl]-3-hydroxy-1,4-naphthalenedione
- CAS Number: 95233-18-4
- PubChem CID: 74989
- DrugBank: DB01117
- ChemSpider: 10482034
- UNII: Y883P1Z2LT
- KEGG: D00236
- ChEBI: CHEBI:575568
- ChEMBL: ChEMBL1450
- CompTox Dashboard (EPA): DTXSID7022629
- ECHA InfoCard: 100.158.738

Chemical and physical data
- Formula: C_{22}H_{19}ClO_{3}
- Molar mass: 366.84 g·mol^{−1}
- 3D model (JSmol): Interactive image
- Melting point: 216 to 219 °C (421 to 426 °F)
- SMILES: OC=2C(=O)c1ccccc1C(=O)C=2[C@@H]3CC[C@H](CC3)c4ccc(Cl)cc4
- InChI: InChI=1S/C22H19ClO3/c23-16-11-9-14(10-12-16)13-5-7-15(8-6-13)19-20(24)17-3-1-2-4-18(17)21(25)22(19)26/h1-4,9-13,15,26H,5-8H2/t13-,15-; Key:KUCQYCKVKVOKAY-CTYIDZIISA-N

Atovaquone, sold under the brand name Mepron, is an naphthoquinone antiprotozoal medication used in the prevention and treatment Pneumocystis jirovecii pneumonia (PCP), and malaria (in combination with proguanil), as well as for treatment of babesiosis (in combination with azithromycin).

Atovaquone is an analogue of ubiquinone (coenzyme Q10) and exerts its pharmaceutical effects by binding to the ubiquinone binding site on the parasitic mitochondrial cytochrome bc1 complex, thus inhibiting a step of protozoal pyrimidine synthesis.

Atovaquone is a hydroxy-1,4-naphthoquinone, an analog of both ubiquinone and lawsone.

== Medical uses ==
Atovaquone is a medication used to treat and/or prevent:

- For pneumocystis pneumonia (PCP), it is used in mild cases, although it is not approved for treatment of severe cases.
- For malaria, it is one of the two components (along with proguanil) in the drug malarone. Malarone has fewer side effects and is more expensive than mefloquine. Resistance has been observed.
- For babesiosis, it is often used in conjunction with oral azithromycin.

=== Pneumocystis pneumonia ===
Trimethoprim/sulfamethoxazole (TMP-SMX, Bactrim) is generally considered first-line therapy for PCP (not to be confused with sulfadiazine and pyrimethamine, which is first line for toxoplasmosis). However, atovaquone may be used in patients who cannot tolerate, or are allergic to, sulfonamide medications such as TMP-SMX. In addition, atovaquone has the advantage of not causing myelosuppression, which is an important issue in patients who have undergone bone marrow transplantation.

Atovaquone is given prophylactically to kidney transplant patients to prevent PCP in cases where Bactrim is contraindicated for the patient.

=== Malaria ===
Atovaquone, as a combination preparation with proguanil, has been commercially available from GlaxoSmithKline since 2000 as Malarone for the treatment and prevention of malaria.

Atovaquone/proguanil is highly effective against parasites in the asexual, blood-stage, as well as the primary liver stages of P. falciparum; it is ineffective against the liver-stage hypnozoites of the P. vivax.

==== Chemoprophylaxis ====
Atovaquone/proguanil is a standard chemoprophylaxis for P. falciparum malaria prevention; it is one of three main antimalarial chemoprophylaxis regimens alongside doxycycline, and mefloquine (the efficacy of the latter being restricted to regions where microbial resistance has not been established). Its efficacy against liver-stage P. falciparum reduces the required duration of post-exposure prophylaxis. Its safety has been established for up to 20 weeks of continuous use, but it is thought to be safe even in case of years of continuous use.

There is limited evidence regarding efficacy of this chemoprophylactic regimen against other Plasmodium species. P. vivax malaria has been noted following cessation of chemoprophylaxis, suggesting this regimen may fail to exhibit complete efficacy against extra-erythrocytic stages of P. vivax.

==== Treatment ====
It is an effective treatment for uncomplicated (mild-to-moderate) malaria caused by P. falciparum. In treatment of P. vivax, the initial atovaquone/proguanil course must be followed up with a course of primaquine.

==== Resistance ====
Malarial resistance to atovaquene monotherapy develops rapidly by a single-point mutation in the cytochrome b gene. Resistance to the atovaquone/proguanil combination is less frequent.

== Adverse effects ==
Atovaquone is associated with gastrointestinal distress, headache, and rash. Adverse effects may necessitate discontinuation of atovaquone therapy. Vomiting and diarrhoea may additionally decrease absorption of atovaquone, causing therapeutic failure (re-administration of a dose after vomiting can be an effective salvage). Atovaquone may cause transient elevations of serum transanimase, and amylase.

== Pharmacology ==
=== Pharmacodynamics ===
Atovaquone is a lipophilic analogue of ubiquinone (coenzyme Q10), which serves as electron acceptor of the parasitic inner mitrochondrial membrane cytochrome bc1 complex, which supplies oxidised ubiquinone to the dihydroorotate dehydrogenase, an enzyme that is crucial for parasitic pyrimidine synthesis.

Atovaquone binds to the ubiquinone site of the cytochrome bc1 site, thus inhibiting electron transport and collapsing the mitochondrial membrane potential. This prevents regeneration of ubiquinone and, consequently, pyrimidine synthesis.

The selectivity of atovaquone for the protozoan cytochrome b may be a result of structural differences between the protozoan and the human enzyme.

==== Synergism ====
In use for malaria, atovaquone acts synergistically with the antifolate proguanil and the two medications are often used in combination; the underlying mechanism of the synergism is unclear as other combinations of electron transport inhibitors and antifolates do not exhibit syngerism. Proguanil enhances atovaquone's action of collapsing the protozoal mitrochondrial membrane potential.

The atovaquone/proguanil combination significantly reduces the incidence of the development of malarial resistance to atovaquone which arises readily with monotherapy; nevertheless, if resistance develops, the synergy diminishes.

== Interactions ==
Atovaquone may compete for plasma protein binding with some pharmaceuticals.

- Rifampicin - causes a substantial reduction in atovaquone plasma concentration by an unknown mechanism.
- Tetracycline - causes a 40% reduction in atovaquone plasma concentration.
- Zidovudine - atovaquone may increase zidovudine plasma concentrations.

== Research ==
Atovaquone's antiprotozoal effects have been researched in toxoplasmosis, and visceral leishmaniasis.

=== COVID-19 ===
Preliminary research found that atovaquone could inhibit the replication of SARS-CoV-2 in vitro. Clinical trials of atovaquone for the treatment of COVID-19 are planned, and ongoing in United States in December 2021.

Atovaquone has also been found to inhibit human coronavirus OC43 and feline coronavirus in vitro.

In newer researches, atovaquone did not demonstrate evidence of enhanced SARS-CoV-2 viral clearance compared with placebo.

== Veterinary use ==
Atovaquone is used in livestock veterinary cases of babesiosis in cattle, especially if imidocarb resistance is a concern.
