= Aditoprim =

Names
- Preferred IUPAC name 5-{[4-(Dimethylamino)-3,5-dimethoxyphenyl]methyl}pyrimidine-2,4-diamine

Identifiers
CAS Number	56066-63-8
3D model (JSmol)	Interactive image
ChEMBL	ChEMBL293299
ChemSpider	62000
PubChem CID	68755
UNII	2Z81WDX2ZH
CompTox Dashboard (EPA)	DTXSID90204616
- InChI: InChI=1S/C15H21N5O2/c1-20(2)13-11(21-3)6-9(7-12(13)22-4)5-10-8-18-15(17)19-14(10)16/h6-8H,5H2,1-4H3,(H4,16,17,18,19) Key: QBQMXWZTRRWPGK-UHFFFAOYSA-N; InChI=1/C15H21N5O2/c1-20(2)13-11(21-3)6-9(7-12(13)22-4)5-10-8-18-15(17)19-14(10)16/h6-8H,5H2,1-4H3,(H4,16,17,18,19) Key: QBQMXWZTRRWPGK-UHFFFAOYAE
- SMILES: CN(C)C1=C(C=C(C=C1OC)CC2=CN=C(N=C2N)N)OC

Properties
Chemical formula	C_{15}H_{21}N_{5}O_{2}
Molar mass	303.366 g·mol^{−1}
- Except where otherwise noted, data are given for materials in their standard state (at 25 °C [77 °F], 100 kPa). Infobox references

Aditoprim is an antibacterial dihydrofolate reductase inhibitor. It is currently being investigated for veterinary use, mostly in China for the treatment of various Streptococcus caused conditions. A 2025 study found that it is toxic to the human gut microbiota as most antibiotics are, and established a microbiologically acceptable daily intake of 91.67 µg/kg.BW/day.
