= Phenformin =

Chemical compound

Clinical data
- AHFS/Drugs.com: International Drug Names
- Routes of administration: Oral
- ATC code: A10BA01 (WHO)

Identifiers
- IUPAC name: 2-(N-phenethylcarbamimidoyl)guanidine
- CAS Number: 114-86-3
- PubChem CID: 8249
- DrugBank: DB00914
- ChemSpider: 7953
- UNII: DD5K7529CE
- KEGG: D08351
- ChEBI: CHEBI:8064
- ChEMBL: ChEMBL170988
- CompTox Dashboard (EPA): DTXSID1023449
- ECHA InfoCard: 100.003.689

Chemical and physical data
- Formula: C_{10}H_{15}N_{5}
- Molar mass: 205.265 g·mol^{−1}
- 3D model (JSmol): Interactive image
- Melting point: 175 to 178 °C (347 to 352 °F)
- SMILES: N(=C(/N=C(\N)N)N)\CCc1ccccc1
- InChI: InChI=1S/C10H15N5/c11-9(12)15-10(13)14-7-6-8-4-2-1-3-5-8/h1-5H,6-7H2,(H6,11,12,13,14,15); Key:ICFJFFQQTFMIBG-UHFFFAOYSA-N

Phenformin is an antidiabetic drug from the biguanide class. It was marketed as DBI by Ciba-Geigy, but was withdrawn from most markets in the late 1970s due to a high risk of lactic acidosis, which was fatal in 50% of cases.

Phenformin was developed in 1957 by Ungar, Freedman and Seymour Shapiro, working for the U.S. Vitamin Corporation. Clinical trials begun in 1958 showed it to be effective, but with gastrointestinal side effects.

== Toxicity ==
Phenformin sales began to decline in the U.S. from 1973 due to negative trial studies and reports of lactic acidosis. By October 1976, the U.S. Food and Drug Administration (FDA) Endocrinology and Metabolism Advisory Committee recommended phenformin be removed from the market. The FDA began formal proceedings in May 1977, leading to Phenformin's eventual withdrawal on November 15, 1978.

In 1977, 385,000 patients with early-stage diabetes were taking phenformin in the U.S.. Ralph Nader's Health Research Group put the U.S. government under pressure to ban the drug. Ciba-Geigy Corp resisted, claiming there was no satisfactory alternative for many patients. But in July the FDA declared the drug an "imminent hazard to the public health" and gave doctors 90 days to switch to an alternative treatment (such as insulin, dietary restrictions or other drugs). As of 2008, phenformin was still legally available in Italy, Brazil, Uruguay, China, Poland, Greece and Portugal and cases of phenformin-induced lactic acidosis continued to be reported worldwide. In Hong Kong, where phenformin is banned, cases of phenformin-induced lactic acidosis occurred after taking Chinese proprietary medicines, claiming to be herbal, which were adulterated with phenformin. In the U.S., in 2001 the FDA recalled Chinese "herbal products" containing phenformin.

The related drug metformin is considerably safer than phenformin, with three cases of lactic acidosis per 100,000 patient-years compared to 64 cases per 100,000 patient-years, and those are mostly confined to patients with impaired renal function.

== Chemistry and pharmacokinetics ==
Phenformin hydrochloride is a white crystalline powder, with a melting point of 175–178 °C; it is soluble at 1 in 8 parts of water and 1 in 15 of ethanol, and practically insoluble in chloroform and ether. Phenformin is less polar and more lipid soluble and exhibits a higher affinity for mitochondrial membranes than metformin. Its dissociation constant (pKa) is 2.7, 11.8 (at 32 °C), and log P = –0.8.

Phenformin is well absorbed after oral administration. The major metabolic reaction is aromatic hydroxylation to form 4-hydroxyphenformin, which is then conjugated with glucuronic acid. Up to about 50% of a dose is excreted in the urine in 24 h, about two–thirds in the form of unchanged drug and one–third as the hydroxy metabolite. Following a single oral dose of 50 mg to eight subjects, peak plasma concentrations of 0.08–0.18 mg/L (mean 0.13) were attained in about 3 h; plasma concentrations were higher in four subjects who were poor metabolisers of debrisoquine in comparison with the four extensive metabolisers. Following daily oral doses of 50 mg three times a day to eight subjects, plasma concentrations of 0.10–0.24 mg/L (mean 0.18) were reported 2 h after a dose. Plasma half-life of phenformin is 10–15 h. Phenformin protein binding in plasma is about 12–20%.

== Research ==
Vladimir Dilman first proposed in 1971 that biguanides like metformin and phenformin may have potential to treat cancer, prevent cancer, and to extend life, an idea that was subsequently supported by in vitro and animal studies, as well as an apparent reduction in the incidence of cancer in people taking metformin for diabetes.

Laboratory studies attribute these apparent effects to inhibition of mTOR, inhibition of complex I, with phenformin being a more potent inhibitor than metformin, It appears that inhibition of complex I may cause diminished TCA cycle intermediate production and decreased mitochondrial ATP production thus resulting in AMPK activation and lower mTOR activity.

== Antiviral activity ==
Phenformin is a drug that blocks a key energy-producing enzyme in cells (NADH:ubiquinone oxidoreductase). It has shown promising activity as a broad-spectrum antiviral. Using a computational approach that analyzed how viruses change cell metabolism, researchers found that infections including SARS-CoV-2, influenza A, and dengue virus all rely on similar metabolic pathways. By targeting these pathways, phenformin could reduce SARS-CoV-2 and dengue virus replication in lab experiments and even showed antiviral effects against SARS-CoV-2 in a Syrian hamster model. These findings suggest phenformin could be developed as a therapy that fights multiple viruses by disrupting the resources they need to replicate.

== See also ==
- Buformin
