= Iclaprim =

Chemical compound

Clinical data
- Routes of administration: intravenous
- ATC code: J01EA03 (WHO)

Legal status
- Legal status: Investigational

Identifiers
- IUPAC name: (RS)-5-[(2-Cyclopropyl-7,8-dimethoxy-2H-chromen-5-yl)methyl]pyrimidine-2,4-diamine
- CAS Number: 192314-93-5
- PubChem CID: 213043
- ChemSpider: 184736
- UNII: 42445HUU0O
- KEGG: D08337
- ChEBI: CHEBI:131724
- ChEMBL: ChEMBL134561
- CompTox Dashboard (EPA): DTXSID70870191
- ECHA InfoCard: 100.130.860

Chemical and physical data
- Formula: C_{19}H_{22}N_{4}O_{3}
- Molar mass: 354.410 g·mol^{−1}
- 3D model (JSmol): Interactive image
- Chirality: Racemic mixture
- SMILES: COC1=C(C2=C(C=CC(O2)C3CC3)C(=C1)CC4=CN=C(N=C4N)N)OC
- InChI: InChI=1S/C19H22N4O3/c1-24-15-8-11(7-12-9-22-19(21)23-18(12)20)13-5-6-14(10-3-4-10)26-16(13)17(15)25-2/h5-6,8-10,14H,3-4,7H2,1-2H3,(H4,20,21,22,23); Key:HWJPWWYTGBZDEG-UHFFFAOYSA-N

Iclaprim is an antibiotic drug candidate that is active against Gram positive organisms. It is administered intravenously.

In vitro, iclaprim is active against methicillin-resistant Staphylococcus aureus (MRSA), vancomycin-resistant Staphylococcus aureus (VRSA), strains of Streptococcus pneumoniae resistant to several common antibiotics, and some Gram-negative bacteria. It is of the diaminopyrimidine dihydrofolate reductase (DHFR)-inhibiting type.

== History ==
Iclaprim is an optimized analog of trimethoprim that was discovered by scientists at Roche. Arpida was spun out of Roche in 1998, and acquired iclaprim from Roche in 2001. Arpida held an initial public offering on the Swiss stock exchange in 2005.

Arpida ran two Phase III clinical trials for complicated skin and skin structure infections that were completed by 2008, but as of 2017, had not been published in the medical literature. A new drug application was filed with the United States Food and Drug Administration based on these trials, and was rejected due to failure to show non-inferiority and due to safety concerns, especially drug-induced QT prolongation. The FDA advisory committee said that the drug "should not be developed further" based on the results presented. A parallel application for marketing approval to the European Medicines Agency was withdrawn in 2009; in the announcement of the withdrawal, the EMA said that there was insufficient data from clinical studies to justify the dosage proposed by the company and that resistance to the drug had already been seen in the clinical trial data.

Arpida collapsed after the rejection by the FDA and the EMA withdrawal. Arpida and the privately owned Swiss company Evolva began discussing an acquisition of Arpida by Evolva, which would allow Evolva to go public via a reverse merger in September 2009. Arpida sold off iclaprim to Acino Pharma in November 2009, and in December 2009, Arpida and Evolva completed their transaction.

Acino sold the rights to iclaprim, its data and regulatory filings, and manufactured drug to a group called Life Sciences Management Group of Bethesda, Maryland, in September 2013 and that company assigned its rights to a company called Nuprim, which had been formed by the former chief executive officer, chief science officer, and US agent of Arpida in 2014. In December 2014, Motif BioSciences and Nuprim signed an agreement allowing Motif to acquire the iclaprim assets, and the transaction was completed in April 2015. In 2015, the FDA granted qualified infectious disease product status for iclaprim.

In September 2017, the FDA granted orphan drug status to iclaprim for the treatment of Staphylococcus aureus lung infections in people with cystic fibrosis. Iclaprim was non-inferior to vancomycin when it was studied in two phase III studies of acute skin and skin structure infections published in 2018. As of February 2019, it is still not approved.

== Chemistry ==
Iclaprim contains a stereocenter and is a racemate, a 1: 1 mixture of (R)- and (S)-enantiomers:

Enantiomers of iclaprim
| CAS number: 1208116-65-7 | CAS number: 1208116-66-8 |

== Names ==
During its development, other names for the drug have included AR-100, MTF-100, RO-48-2622, and the brand name Mersarex. It received its INN name in 2003.
