= Trimetrexate =

Chemical compound

Clinical data
- AHFS/Drugs.com: Consumer Drug Information
- MedlinePlus: a694019
- ATC code: P01AX07 (WHO)

Pharmacokinetic data
- Bioavailability: VD: 20-30 Liters
- Metabolism: Oxidative O-demethylation, followed by conjugation with glucuronide or sulfate
- Elimination half-life: 11 to 12 hours

Identifiers
- IUPAC name: 5-methyl-6-[(3,4,5-trimethoxyphenyl) aminomethyl] quinazoline-2,4-diamine
- CAS Number: 52128-35-5
- PubChem CID: 5583
- IUPHAR/BPS: 7613
- DrugBank: DB01157
- ChemSpider: 5381
- UNII: UPN4ITI8T4
- KEGG: D06238
- ChEMBL: ChEMBL119
- CompTox Dashboard (EPA): DTXSID3023714

Chemical and physical data
- Formula: C_{19}H_{23}N_{5}O_{3}
- Molar mass: 369.425 g·mol^{−1}
- 3D model (JSmol): Interactive image
- SMILES: n3c1c(c(c(cc1)CNc2cc(OC)c(OC)c(OC)c2)C)c(nc3N)N
- InChI: InChI=1S/C19H23N5O3/c1-10-11(5-6-13-16(10)18(20)24-19(21)23-13)9-22-12-7-14(25-2)17(27-4)15(8-12)26-3/h5-8,22H,9H2,1-4H3,(H4,20,21,23,24); Key:NOYPYLRCIDNJJB-UHFFFAOYSA-N

Trimetrexate is a quinazoline derivative. It is a dihydrofolate reductase inhibitor.

== Uses ==
It has been used with leucovorin in treating pneumocystis pneumonia.

It has been investigated for use in treating leiomyosarcoma. It is a methotrexate (MTX) analog that is active against transport-deficient MTX-resistant tumor cells that overcome the acquired and natural resistance to methotrexate. Other uses include skin lymphoma.
