= 4,5-Diaminopyrimidine =

Names
- Preferred IUPAC name Pyrimidine-4,5-diamine

Identifiers
CAS Number	13754-19-3
3D model (JSmol)	Interactive image; Interactive image
ChemSpider	75525
ECHA InfoCard	100.033.930
PubChem CID	83703
UNII	IL00Z9WFM8
CompTox Dashboard (EPA)	DTXSID40160233
- InChI: InChI=1S/C4H6N4/c5-3-1-7-2-8-4(3)6/h1-2H,5H2,(H2,6,7,8) Key: PPAULTVPKLVLII-UHFFFAOYSA-N; InChI=1/C4H6N4/c5-3-1-7-2-8-4(3)6/h1-2H,5H2,(H2,6,7,8) Key: PPAULTVPKLVLII-UHFFFAOYAQ
- SMILES: C1=C(C(=NC=N1)N)N; n1cc(N)c(nc1)N

Properties
Chemical formula	C_{4}H_{6}N_{4}
Molar mass	110.11724 g/mol
Melting point	204 to 206 °C (399 to 403 °F; 477 to 479 K)
Boiling point	229 °C (444 °F; 502 K) (32 mmHg)
- Except where otherwise noted, data are given for materials in their standard state (at 25 °C [77 °F], 100 kPa). verify (what is ?) Infobox references

4,5-Diaminopyrimidine is a diaminopyrimidine.

== See also ==
- 2,4-Diaminopyrimidine
