= 2,4-Diaminopyrimidine =

Names
- Preferred IUPAC name Pyrimidine-2,4-diamine

Identifiers
CAS Number	156-81-0
3D model (JSmol)	Interactive image; Interactive image
ChemSpider	60756
ECHA InfoCard	100.005.331
EC Number	205-862-3
PubChem CID	67431
UNII	L5ZY0JJP5J
CompTox Dashboard (EPA)	DTXSID70166021
- InChI: InChI=1S/C4H6N4/c5-3-1-2-7-4(6)8-3/h1-2H,(H4,5,6,7,8) Key: YAAWASYJIRZXSZ-UHFFFAOYSA-N; InChI=1/C4H6N4/c5-3-1-2-7-4(6)8-3/h1-2H,(H4,5,6,7,8) Key: YAAWASYJIRZXSZ-UHFFFAOYAE
- SMILES: C1=CN=C(N=C1N)N; n1c(N)ccnc1N

Properties
Chemical formula	C_{4}H_{6}N_{4}
Molar mass	110.12 g/mol
Melting point	143 to 147 °C (289 to 297 °F; 416 to 420 K)

Hazards
- GHS labelling
Pictograms	(GHS07: Exclamation mark)
Signal word	Warning
Hazard statements	H315, H319, H335
Precautionary statements	P261, P264, P271, P280, P302+P352, P304+P340, P305+P351+P338, P312, P321, P332+P313, P337+P313, P362, P403+P233, P405, P501
- Except where otherwise noted, data are given for materials in their standard state (at 25 °C [77 °F], 100 kPa). verify (what is ?) Infobox references

2,4-Diaminopyrimidine is an organic compound with the formula C_{4}H_{2}(NH_{2})_{2}. It is the parent of one isomer of the diaminopyrimidines. Such compounds are structurally related to folic acid and the basis of much medicinal chemistry including the drug pyrimethamine.

== See also ==
- 4,5-Diaminopyrimidine
