= Tetroxoprim =

Chemical compound

Clinical data
- ATC code: J01EE06 (WHO) (with sulfadiazine)

Identifiers
- IUPAC name: 5-[3,5-Dimethoxy-4-(2-methoxyethoxy)benzyl]pyrimidine-2,4-diamine
- CAS Number: 53808-87-0
- PubChem CID: 65450
- ChemSpider: 58910
- UNII: 5R6712AY0K
- KEGG: D06097
- ChEMBL: ChEMBL32039
- CompTox Dashboard (EPA): DTXSID80202085
- ECHA InfoCard: 100.053.427

Chemical and physical data
- Formula: C_{16}H_{22}N_{4}O_{4}
- Molar mass: 334.376 g·mol^{−1}
- 3D model (JSmol): Interactive image
- SMILES: COCCOc1c(OC)cc(Cc2cnc(N)nc2N)cc1OC
- InChI: InChI=1S/C16H22N4O4/c1-21-4-5-24-14-12(22-2)7-10(8-13(14)23-3)6-11-9-19-16(18)20-15(11)17/h7-9H,4-6H2,1-3H3,(H4,17,18,19,20); Key:WSWJIZXMAUYHOE-UHFFFAOYSA-N

Tetroxoprim (INN) is a derivative of trimethoprim. It was first described in 1979.

Tetroxoprim is used often in combination with sulfadiazine (co-tetroxazine) for treating bacterial infections, with brand names including Biroxin and Tibirox.
