= Antifolate =

Class of antimetabolite medications

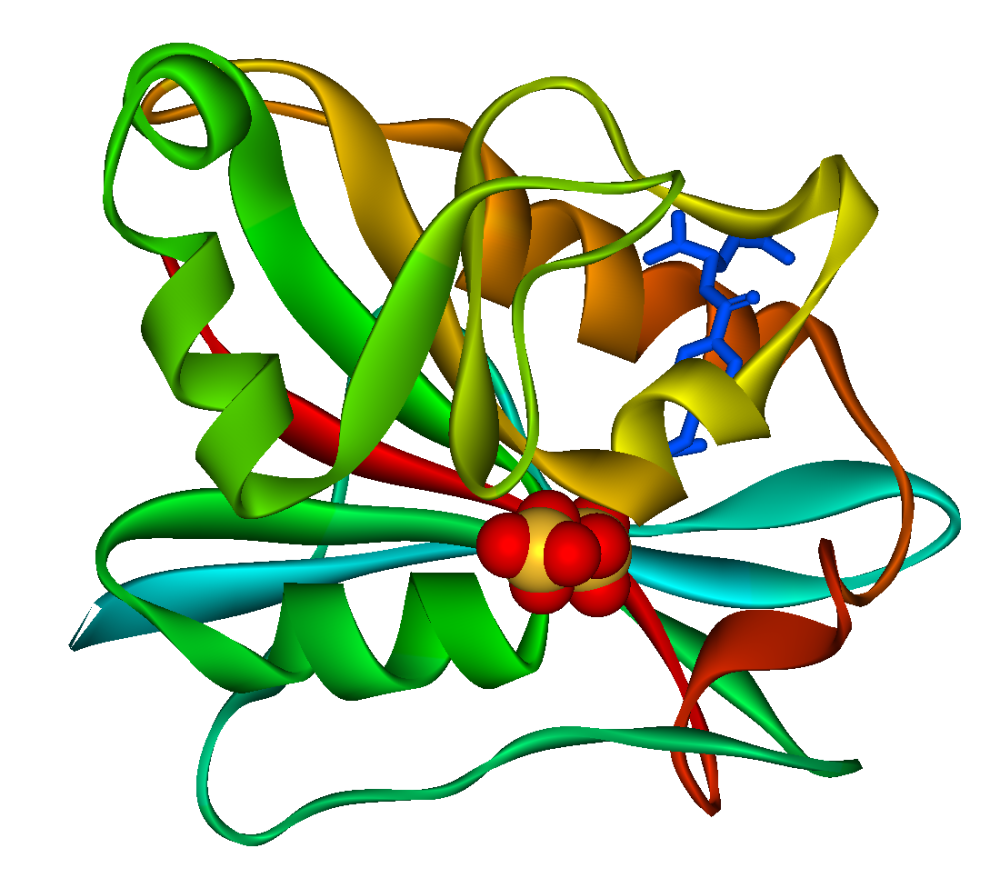
Dihydrofolate reductase (DHFR)

Antifolates, also known as antifols, are a class of antimetabolite medications that antagonise (that is, block) the actions of folic acid (vitamin B_{9}). Folic acid's primary function in the body is as a cofactor to various methyltransferases involved in serine, methionine, thymidine and purine biosynthesis. Consequently, antifolates inhibit cell division, DNA/RNA synthesis and repair and protein synthesis. Some such as proguanil, pyrimethamine and trimethoprim selectively inhibit folate's actions in microbial organisms such as bacteria, protozoa and fungi. The majority of antifolates work by inhibiting dihydrofolate reductase (DHFR), i.e. are dihydrofolate reductase inhibitors.

== Comparison of available agents ==
Methotrexate

Pemetrexed

Raltitrexed

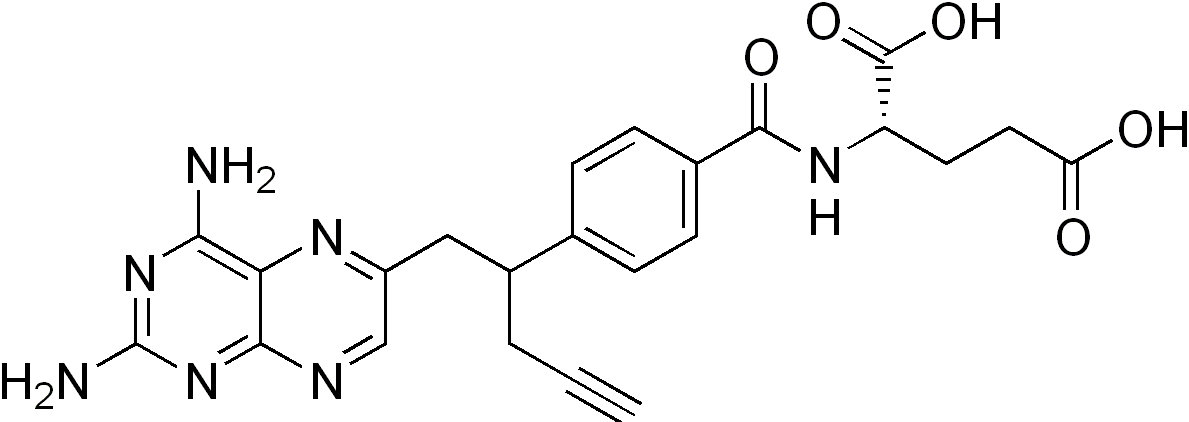
Pralatrexate

Drug	Class	Pharmacologic target	Myelosuppressive effect	US pregnancy category	Indications	Notable adverse effects
Methotrexate	Antineoplastic & immunosuppressant	Mammalian DHFR	+++	X	Malignancies (esp. haematologic malignancies and osteosarcoma), ectopic pregnancy and autoimmune conditions (esp. rheumatoid arthritis, psoriasis, Granulomatosis with polyangiitis, Goodpasture syndrome, etc.)	Kidney or liver failure, Stevens–Johnson syndrome, toxic epidermal necrolysis, infection, aplastic anaemia, opportunistic infections and GI effects.
Pemetrexed	Antineoplastic	Mammalian DHFR, TS, GARFT	+++	D	Non-small cell lung carcinoma & mesothelioma	Nausea, vomiting, dyspnoea, constipation, chest pain, diarrhoea, weight loss, stomatitis, rash, fever, peripheral neuropathy, dehydration, kidney failure, Stevens–Johnson syndrome, toxic epidermal necrolysis and erythema multiforme.
Proguanil	Antimalarial	Protozoal DHFR	±	C	Malaria, prevention and treatment	Abdominal pain, headaches, increased LFTs, myalgia, nausea, opportunistic infections, diarrhoea, vomiting, etc. Less commonly Stevens–Johnson syndrome, toxic epidermal necrolysis, agranulocytosis, liver failure, anaphylaxis, etc.
Pyrimethamine	Antiprotozoal	Protozoal DHFR	±	C	Malaria, toxoplasmosis and pneumocystis jiroveci pneumonia.	Stevens–Johnson syndrome, toxic epidermal necrolysis, agranulocytosis and aplastic anaemia.
Trimethoprim	Broad-spectrum antimicrobial	Microbial DHFR	±	C	Numerous (especially when in combination with the sulfonamide, sulfamethoxazole); treatment & prophylaxis for pneumocystis jiroveci pneumonia, malaria and toxoplasmosis. Treatment of melioidosis, shigellosis, listeria, urinary tract infections, acute infectious exacerbations of chronic bronchitis, infection prophylaxis in HIV-positive individuals, cyclospora protozoa, etc.	Stevens–Johnson syndrome, toxic epidermal necrolysis, agranulocytosis and aplastic anaemia.

== Mechanism ==
Many are primarily DHFR inhibitors, but raltitrexed is an inhibitor of thymidylate synthase, and pemetrexed inhibits both and a third enzyme.

Antifolates act specifically during DNA and RNA synthesis, and thus are cytotoxic during the S-phase of the cell cycle. Thus, they have a greater toxic effect on rapidly dividing cells (such as malignant and myeloid cells, and GI & oral mucosa), which replicate their DNA more frequently, and thus inhibits the growth and proliferation of these non-cancerous cells as well as causing the side-effects listed.

== Limitations ==
=== Side-effects ===
Antifolate drugs that target non-mammalian cells (i.e. not anticancer) are designed to have minimal effect on human DHFR, thereby minimizing the incidence of antifolate side effects (see below) in people who use them. For example, trimethoprim is several thousand times more potent against the bacterial DHFR compared to the mammalian DHFR. Likewise, pyrimethamine is selective for plasmodial DHFR.

Folic acid

Antifolate drugs that target mammalian cells (e.g. methotrexate) can only non-selectively target all the DHFR in one's body. The most affected cells are the fast-dividing ones, including cancer cells and normal cells of the bone marrow, skin, and hair, causing side effects similar to folate deficiency. Both high-folate diets and supplemental folic acid may help reduce the toxic side-effects of low-dose methotrexate without decreasing its effectiveness. Anyone taking low-dose methotrexate for the health problems listed above should consult with a physician about the need for a folic acid supplement.

As folate is vital in the first trimester of pregnancy for healthy fetal development, the use of antifolates targeting the human enzyme is strongly contraindicated contraindicated in pregnancy and carries significant teratogenic risk. In contrast, the evidence of teratogenicty and effect size for trimethoprim is weak enough that it can be considered acceptable during pregnancy (even the first trimester) depending on the expected benefits. (See the pregnancy category column in the table above.)

=== Resistance ===
While the role of folate as a cancer treatment is well established, its long-term effectiveness is diminished by cellular response. In response to decreased tetrahydrofolate (THF), the cell begins to transcribe more DHF reductase, the enzyme that reduces DHF to THF. Because methotrexate is a competitive inhibitor of DHF reductase, increased concentrations of DHF reductase can overcome the drugs inhibition.

Many new drugs are under development to reduce antifolate drug resistance.

== Drugs that incidentally antagonize folate ==
The name antifolate usually refers to drugs whose folate antagonism is intentional. In contrast, there are some other drugs, of several drug classes, that antagonize folate incidentally, as an adverse effect, whether mildly or heavily. This effect is often not noticeable except when it causes a neural tube defect in a fetus carried by a woman taking the medication. Such drugs include some anticonvulsants (valproic acid, carbamazepine, phenobarbital, phenytoin, and primidone) and trimethoprim. Lamotrigine is also an anticonvulsant with known (from in vitro testing) weak anti-folate effects. Many of these, or metabolites thereof, seem to mimick the default aromatic ring moiety of folic acid (-N=C(NH_{2})-NH-CO-C(R)=), especially lamotrigine and trimethoprim that share sequence (-N=C(NH_{2})-N=C(NH_{2})-C(R)=) with methotrexate, in which it is the primary modification to the folic acid structure.

== See also ==
- Dihydropteroate synthase inhibitors, a class of antimicrobials that work by inhibiting folate biosynthesis (a process that does not occur in human cells).
