= Phototrexate =

Photopharmacological agent

trans-Phototrexate

Clinical data
- ATC code: None

Identifiers
- IUPAC name: (2S)-2-[(4-[(2,4-Diaminoquinazolin-6-yl)diazenyl]benzoyl)amino]pentanedioic acid
- CAS Number: 2268033-83-4
- PubChem CID: 139030983
- UNII: 7Z32VZR9Y3

Chemical and physical data
- Formula: C_{20}H_{19}N_{7}O_{5}
- Molar mass: 437.416 g·mol^{−1}
- 3D model (JSmol): Interactive image
- SMILES: C1(=NC(=NC2=C1C=C(C=C2)N=NC3=CC=C(C=C3)C(=O)N[C@@H](CCC(=O)O)C(=O)O)N)N
- InChI: InChI=1S/C20H19N7O5/c21-17-13-9-12(5-6-14(13)24-20(22)25-17)27-26-11-3-1-10(2-4-11)18(30)23-15(19(31)32)7-8-16(28)29/h1-6,9,15H,7-8H2,(H,23,30)(H,28,29)(H,31,32)(H4,21,22,24,25)/t15-/m0/s1; Key:IODLJULYGHWOLC-HNNXBMFYSA-N

Phototrexate is a photochromic antifolate drug developed at the Institute for Bioengineering of Catalonia (IBEC, The Barcelona Institute of Science and Technology). In particular, it is a photopharmacological agent that behaves as light-regulated inhibitor of the dihydrofolate reductase (DHFR) enzyme. Phototrexate is a photoisomerizable structural analogue of the chemotherapy agent methotrexate. It is also an example of "azologization". Pharmacological effects of phototrexate can be switched on and off by UVA and visible light, respectively. Phototrexate is almost inactive in its trans configuration while it behaves as a potent antifolate in its cis configuration. It can also spontaneously self-deactivate in the dark.

cis-Phototrexate

Artistic animation of phototrexate photoisomerization, for illustrative purposes only.

== See also ==
- Cancer
- Psoriasis
- Psoriatic arthritis
