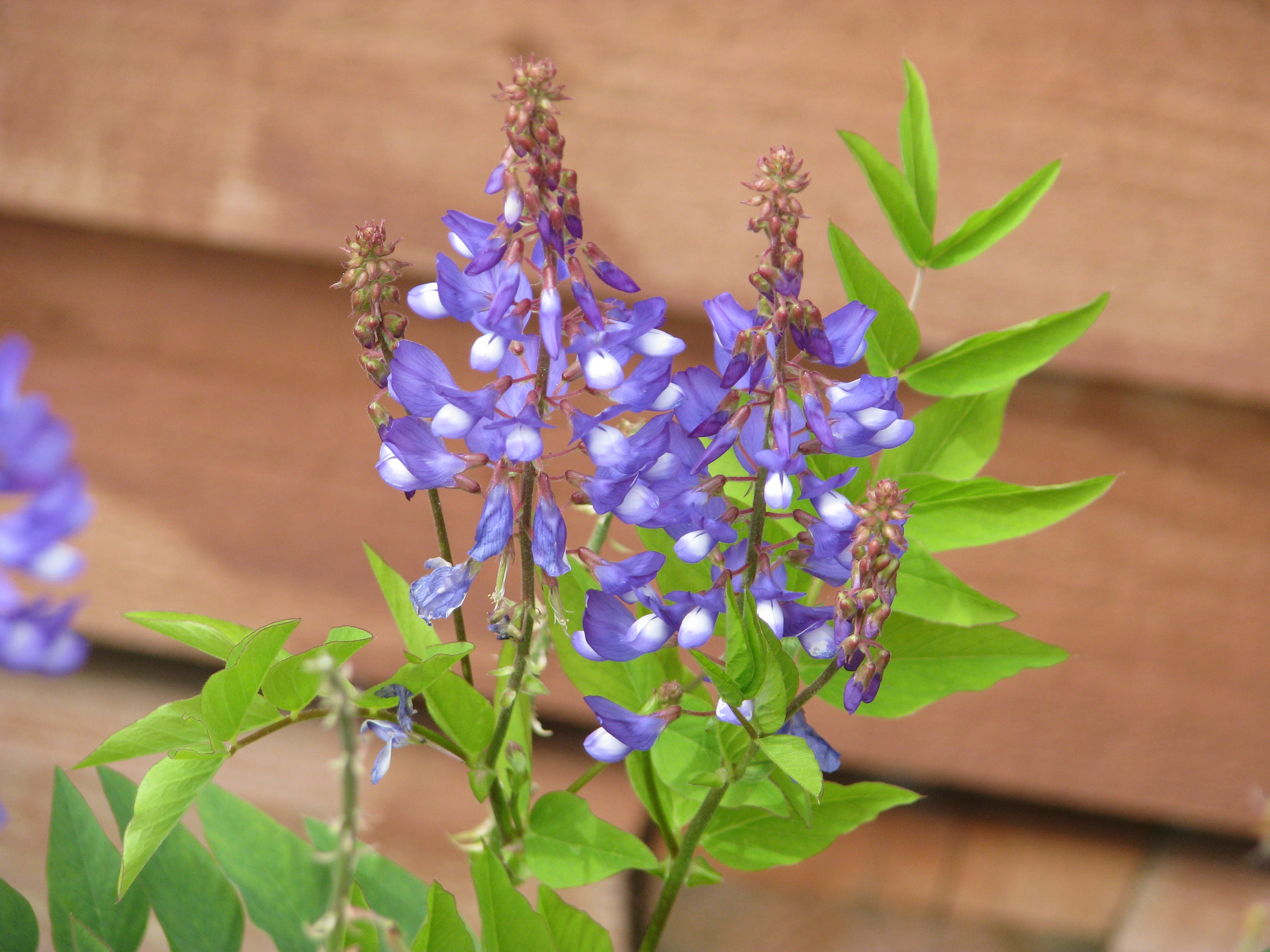

Scientific classification
- Kingdom: Plantae
- Clade: Embryophytes
- Clade: Tracheophytes
- Clade: Spermatophytes
- Clade: Angiosperms
- Clade: Eudicots
- Clade: Rosids
- Order: Fabales
- Family: Fabaceae
- Subfamily: Faboideae
- Genus: Galega
- Species: G. orientalis

Binomial name
- Galega orientalis Lam.

= Galega orientalis =

Species of legume

Galega orientalis is a species of flowering plant in the Fabaceae, the legume family. It is known commonly as fodder galega and eastern galega. It is cultivated as a fodder and forage for livestock.

This species is native to the Caucasus. Its native range includes parts of Russia, Armenia, and Azerbaijan. It has been introduced to many other regions for use in agriculture.

== Taxonomy ==
It was first described in 1788 by Jean-Baptiste Lamarck.

== Description ==
This species is a perennial herb with a taproot and rhizome system. It produces stems up to 2 metres (6 ft 7 in) tall which branch near the middle. The leaves are pinnate. The inflorescence bears up to 70 lilac-colored flowers, and some cultivars can produce more. The fruit pod is up to 4 centimetres (1.6 in) long and contains up to 8 seeds each a few millimeters in length.

== Biology ==
The plant can grow on a variety of soil types, performing best on deep, light, friable, well-drained, higher-pH soils. It is quite tolerant of winter cold, but late-season frosts can damage fresh growth. It is somewhat tolerant of drought and flooding. It does not do as well on acidic, peaty, or water-logged soils. It responds well to supplemental phosphorus and potassium.

Like many other legumes, it fixes nitrogen. Its root nodule bacterium is Rhizobium galegae. Growers must ensure that their seed has been inoculated with it to produce adequate plant growth. Some strains of R. galegae are more effective symbionts than others, and different strains compete on one plant. When a less effective strain outcompetes effective strains, the plant does not grow as well.

The rhizome of the plant makes it persistent in the field; the rhizome spreads, sending up new stems, and the plant can live well over ten years, even exceeding 30 years in some areas.

== Ecology ==
The flowers are pollinated by bees. It produces good quantities of nectar and pollen. It makes a good honey plant.

The plant is host to several fungal species, some pathogenic, such as Ascochyta sp., which causes blight, Fusarium oxysporum, which causes Fusarium wilt, and the gray mould Botrytis cinerea. Other species include Humicola brevis, Acremonium strictum, and Cladosporium cladosporioides.

== Uses ==
This plant is grown to feed livestock. Its potential value as a fodder was first suggested in 1908, and trials began near Moscow in the 1920s. It is productive, persistent, and nutritious, with high protein. It contains high levels of carotene, minerals, and vitamins, especially vitamin C. It produces many crops of vegetation, its rhizome continuing to produce stems as it grows. It can be cut down repeatedly and taken for hay and silage, and the stubble can be grazed. The whole plant is not generally suitable for grazing, though. It works well as a companion to a non-competitive grass such as timothy or fescue. In cold northern regions it is valuable because it produces vegetation earlier in the spring and continues later in the fall than some other forages. It is low in toxic alkaloid concentration, making it useful as feed when its alkaloid-rich close relative Galega officinalis is not.

The cultivar 'Gale', developed jointly by Estonian and Russian breeders, was released in 1987. The cultivars 'Vidmantai', 'Laukiai', and 'Melsviai' have been bred in Lithuania.

The plant has been investigated as a source of biogas, and it has produced a good amount in trials when mixed with grasses and manure.

It has been tested as an agent of bioremediation of oil-polluted soils. Some of the bacteria it hosts can degrade soil pollutants such as toluenes.

It is also grown as an ornamental plant in gardens.

The plant has also been considered a prospective energy crop.
