= Sitagliptin =

Diabetes medication

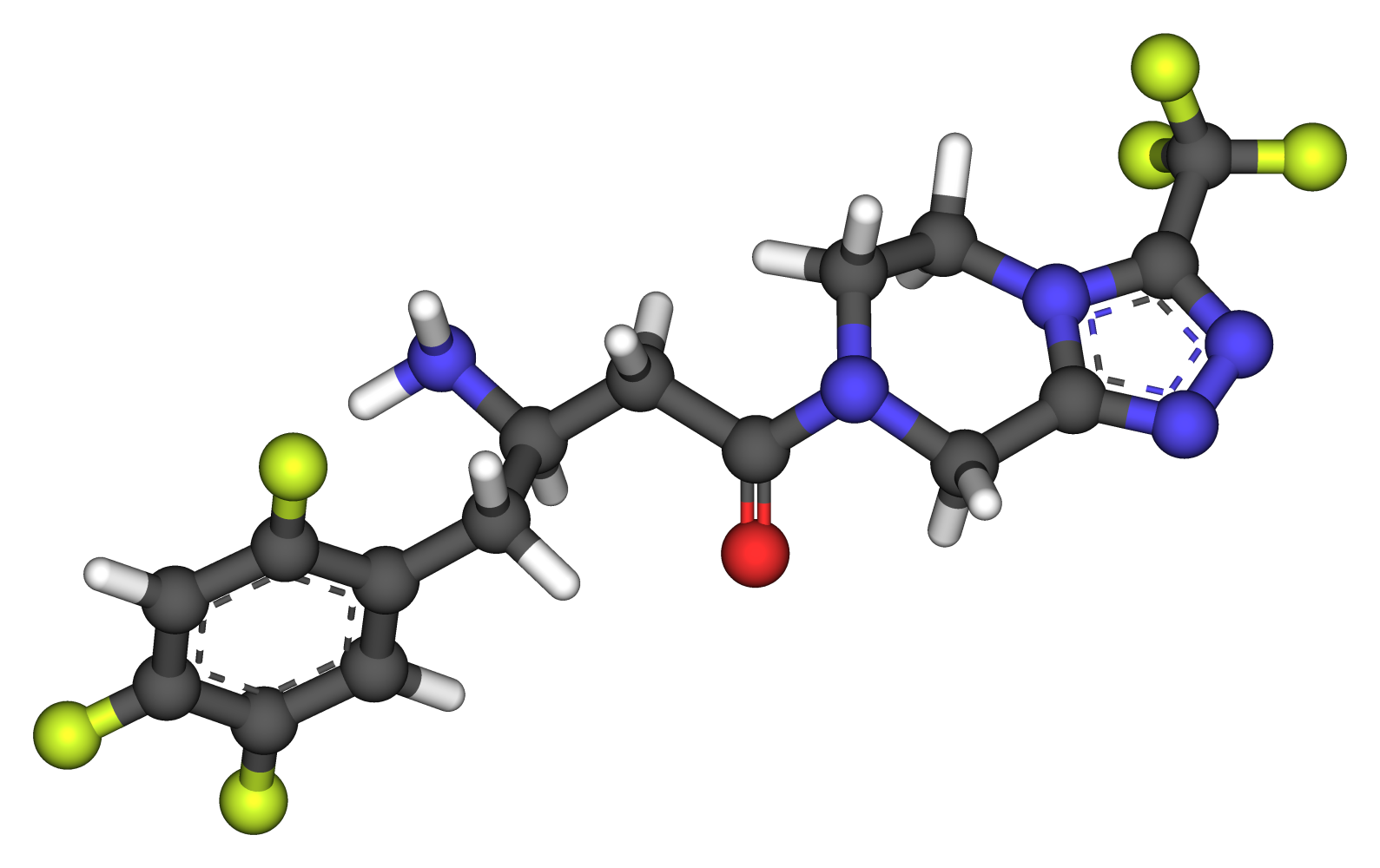

Clinical data
- Pronunciation: /sɪtəˈɡlɪptɪn/
- Trade names: Januvia, Zituvio, others
- AHFS/Drugs.com: Monograph
- MedlinePlus: a606023
- License data: US DailyMed: Sitagliptin
- Pregnancy category: AU: B3
- Routes of administration: By mouth
- ATC code: A10BH01 (WHO)

Legal status
- Legal status: AU: S4 (Prescription only); CA: ℞-only; UK: POM (Prescription only); US: ℞-only; EU: Rx-only

Pharmacokinetic data
- Bioavailability: 87%
- Protein binding: 38%
- Metabolism: Liver (CYP3A4- and CYP2C8-mediated)
- Elimination half-life: 8 to 14 h
- Excretion: Kidney (80%)

Identifiers
- IUPAC name: (R)-4-oxo-4-[3-(trifluoromethyl)-5,6-dihydro[1,2,4]triazolo[4,3-a]pyrazin-7(8H)-yl]-1-(2,4,5-trifluorophenyl)butan-2-amine
- CAS Number: 486460-32-6
- PubChem CID: 4369359
- IUPHAR/BPS: 6286
- DrugBank: DB01261
- ChemSpider: 3571948
- UNII: QFP0P1DV7Z
- KEGG: D08516; as salt: D06645
- ChEBI: CHEBI:40237
- ChEMBL: ChEMBL1422
- CompTox Dashboard (EPA): DTXSID70197572
- ECHA InfoCard: 100.217.948

Chemical and physical data
- Formula: C_{16}H_{15}F_{6}N_{5}O
- Molar mass: 407.320 g·mol^{−1}
- 3D model (JSmol): Interactive image
- SMILES: Fc1cc(c(F)cc1F)C[C@@H](N)CC(=O)N3Cc2nnc(n2CC3)C(F)(F)F
- InChI: InChI=1S/C16H15F6N5O/c17-10-6-12(19)11(18)4-8(10)3-9(23)5-14(28)26-1-2-27-13(7-26)24-25-15(27)16(20,21)22/h4,6,9H,1-3,5,7,23H2/t9-/m1/s1; Key:MFFMDFFZMYYVKS-SECBINFHSA-N

Sitagliptin, sold under the brand name Januvia among others, is an anti-diabetic medication used to treat type 2 diabetes. It is in the dipeptidyl peptidase-4 (DPP-4) inhibitor class and works by increasing the production of insulin and decreasing the production of glucagon by the pancreas. In the United Kingdom it is listed as less preferred than metformin or a sulfonylurea. It is taken by mouth. It is also available in the fixed-dose combination medication sitagliptin/metformin (Janumet, Janumet XR).

Common side effects include headaches, swelling of the legs, and upper respiratory tract infections. Serious side effects may include angioedema, low blood sugar, kidney problems, pancreatitis, and joint pain. Whether use in pregnancy or breastfeeding is safe is unclear.

Sitagliptin was developed by Merck & Co. and approved for medical use in the United States in 2006. In 2023, it was the 123rd most commonly prescribed medication in the United States, with more than 5 million prescriptions. It is available as a generic medication, but not in the United States.

== Medical uses ==
Sitagliptin is used to treat type 2 diabetes. It is generally less preferred than metformin or sulfonylureas. It is taken by mouth. It is also available as the fixed-dose combinations of sitagliptin/metformin (Janumet, Janumet XR) and sitagliptin/simvastatin (Juvisync).

Sitagliptin should not be used to treat type 1 diabetes. In December 2020, the US Food and Drug Administration (FDA) approved labeling changes stating that Januvia (sitagliptin), Janumet (sitagliptin and metformin hydrochloride), and Janumet XR (sitagliptin and metformin hydrochloride extended-release) are not proven to improve glycemic (blood sugar) control in children aged 10 to 17 with type 2 diabetes. The drugs are approved to improve blood sugar control in adults aged 18 and older with type 2 diabetes.

== Adverse effects ==
Adverse effects from sitagliptin are similar to placebo, except for rare nausea, common cold-like symptoms, and photosensitivity. It does not increase the risk of diarrhea. No significant difference exists in the occurrence of hypoglycemia between placebo and sitagliptin. In those taking sulphonylureas, the risk of low blood sugar is increased.

The existence of rare case reports of kidney failure and hypersensitivity reactions is noted in the United States prescribing information, but a causative role for sitagliptin has not been established.

Several postmarketing reports of pancreatitis (some fatal) have been made in people treated with sitagliptin and other DPP-4 inhibitors, and the US FDA package insert carries a warning to this effect, although the causal link between sitagliptin and pancreatitis has not yet been fully substantiated. One study with lab rats published in 2009 concluded that some of the possible risks of pancreatitis or pancreatic cancer may be reduced when it is used with metformin. However, while DPP-4 inhibitors showed an increase in such risk factors, as of 2009, no increase in pancreatic cancer has been reported in individuals taking DPP-4 inhibitors.

In 2015, the US Food and Drug Administration (FDA) added a new warning and precaution about the risk of "severe and disabling" joint pain to the labels of all DPP-4 inhibitor medicines.

== Mechanism of action ==
Sitagliptin works to competitively inhibit the enzyme dipeptidyl peptidase 4 (DPP-4). This enzyme breaks down the incretins GLP-1 and GIP, gastrointestinal hormones released in response to a meal. By preventing breakdown of GLP-1 and GIP, they are able to increase the secretion of insulin and suppress the release of glucagon by the alpha cells of the pancreas. This drives blood glucose levels towards normal. As the blood glucose level approaches normal, the amounts of insulin released and glucagon suppressed diminishes, thus tending to prevent an "overshoot" and subsequent low blood sugar (hypoglycemia), which is seen with some other oral hypoglycemic agents.

Sitagliptin has been shown to lower HbA1c level by about 0.7% points versus placebo. It is slightly less effective than metformin when used as a monotherapy. It does not cause weight gain and has less hypoglycemia compared to sulfonylureas. Sitagliptin is recommended as a second-line drug (in combination with other drugs) after the combination of diet/exercise and metformin fails.

== History ==
Sitagliptin was approved by the US Food and Drug Administration (FDA) in October 2006, and is sold under the brand name Januvia. In April 2007, the FDA approved an oral combination of sitagliptin/metformin sold under the brand name Janumet. In October 2011, the FDA approved an oral combination of sitagliptin/simvastatin sold under the brand name Juvisync. The extended release version of sitagliptin/metformin was approved in February 2012.
