= Synthalin =

- Skeletal formula of synthalin

Names
- Preferred IUPAC name N,N′′′-(Decane-1,10-diyl)diguanidine

Identifiers
CAS Number	111-23-9
3D model (JSmol)	Interactive image
ChEBI	CHEBI:84338
ChEMBL	ChEMBL1194310
ChemSpider	60335
ECHA InfoCard	100.003.499
EC Number	203-848-1
MeSH	synthalin+A
PubChem CID	66977
UNII	ZEA6Y34XYT
CompTox Dashboard (EPA)	DTXSID50911935
- InChI: InChI=1S/C12H28N6/c13-11(14)17-9-7-5-3-1-2-4-6-8-10-18-12(15)16/h1-10H2,(H4,13,14,17)(H4,15,16,18) Key: OZZMUVKANAPKGI-UHFFFAOYSA-N
- SMILES: NC(=N)NCCCCCCCCCCNC(N)=N

Properties
Chemical formula	C_{12}H_{28}N_{6}
Molar mass	256.398 g·mol^{−1}

Pharmacology
Routes of administration	Oral

Related compounds
Related compounds	Spermine; Arginylglycylaspartic acid; Dibutylhexamethylenediamine
- Except where otherwise noted, data are given for materials in their standard state (at 25 °C [77 °F], 100 kPa). Infobox references

Synthalin was an oral anti-diabetic drug. Discovered in 1926 it was marketed in Europe by Schering AG of Berlin as a synthetic drug with insulin-like properties that could be taken orally. However, it was toxic to the liver and kidney and was withdrawn from the market in the early 1940s.

== History ==
The folk remedy French lilac (Galega officinalis), was used to treat the symptoms of diabetes, and towards the end of the nineteenth century it was discovered to contain galegine, a derivative of guanidine. This had a hypoglycaemic effect but was very toxic to the liver. Karl Slotta at the Chemistry Institute of the University of Vienna synthesized derived compounds that had a polymethylene chain with a guanidine group at each end. These diguanides were less toxic and more potent than guanidine. In 1926, E. Frank, working in Oskar Minkowski's clinic in Wroclaw performed a clinical trial on one of these agents. It was subsequently marketed as Synthalin by Schering AG for treating mild cases of diabetes.

Adverse reports on the toxicity of Synthalin prompted the development of Synthalin B (which had a slightly longer polymethylene chain and was claimed to be safer) and the former product was re-branded Synthalin A. However liver toxicity continued to be a problem, leading to discontinuation in the 1930s, though Synthalin B continued to be used in Germany until the mid-1940s.

=== Anti-trypanosome ===
After it was discovered that trypanosomes require a plentiful supply of glucose in order to reproduce, researchers tested Synthalin and related compounds to see if they could be effective treatments. Synthalin was effective, at doses lower than would interfere with blood sugar in the patient. Further modifications to the chemical structure led to the diamidine class of drugs, of which pentamidine is still used against trypanosomiasis. Pentamidine is also effective against a range of protozoa such as Pneumocystis jirovecii, which causes pneumocystis pneumonia in AIDS patients.
