= Coleophora vicinella =

Scientific classification
- Kingdom: Animalia
- Phylum: Arthropoda
- Clade: Pancrustacea
- Class: Insecta
- Order: Lepidoptera
- Family: Coleophoridae
- Genus: Coleophora
- Species: C. vicinella

Binomial name
- Coleophora vicinella Zeller, 1849

Synonyms
- Coleophora gypsophilae Christoph, 1862

Species of moth

Coleophora vicinella is a moth of the family Coleophoridae. It is found from France to Ukraine and then further south.

The wingspan is 16–17 mm (0.63–0.67 in).

The larvae feed on Astragalus, Coronilla, Dorycnium, Galega and Medicago sativa. Larvae can be found from autumn to May of the following year.
