= Karl Slotta =

American biochemist (1895–1987)

- Born: May 12, 1895; Breslau, Germany (now Wrocław, Poland)
- Died: July 17, 1987 (aged 92); Coral Gables, Florida, U.S.
- Spouse: Maja Slotta

Academic background
- Education: University of Breslau

Academic work
- Discipline: Chemistry
- Sub-discipline: biochemistry
- Institutions: Chemical Institute in Breslau, Germany, Chemistry Institute of the University of Vienna, Instituto Butantan, University of Miami
- Notable ideas: oral contraceptive pills

Karl Heinrich Slotta (May 12, 1895 – July 17, 1987) was a biochemist. His discovery of progesterone and its relationship to ovulation led to the development of birth control pills.

== Life ==
Slotta was born in Breslau, Germany, now Wrocław, Poland. He was drafted into military service in World War I. After the war, he began his hormone research at the Chemical Institute in Breslau under the guidance of Professor Ludwig Fraenkel. He obtained his PhD in chemistry from the University of Breslau in 1923 where he discovered that the biguanided metformin lowers the blood glucose concentration in rabbits. He continued post-doc work at the university with guidance from Professor Fraenkel.

In 1933, Slotta was first, or one of the first, to isolate and identify progesterone (there being four separate research labs which claim such distinction).

In 1934, he proposed a correct structural formula for the hormone. While working at the Chemistry Institute of the University of Vienna, Slotta synthesized compounds, analogous to plant extract from French lilac, then used to treat symptoms of diabetes. The synthetic, marketed as Synthalin, proved less toxic and more potent than prior plant products. Slotta was appointed professor of chemistry in 1935, but, during the rise of the National Socialist regime was summarily dismissed from his position, becoming one of the legion of German scholars "displaced" by the Nazis. As persecution escalated, in 1935 he left Germany with his family for the safety of Brazil.

In Brazil, Slotta initially worked on the chemistry of coffee, from which bean oil he extracted a substance he called cafestol that he reported had estrogenic properties. As a result, European pharmaceutical companies sought to duplicate his work, in the hope of producing steroidal sex hormone from such an abundant and inexpensive material. The project proved unsuccessful; however, Slotta was recognized with an appointment at the Instituto Butantan, a Brazilian biomedical research center of the São Paulo State Secretary of Health, located near the campus of the University of São Paulo. In 1935 he was appointed director of the Chemical Institute, primarily engaged in the production of antivenins to treat local farmers. In time, the Institute developed basic and applied biomedical research in many areas, including molecular biology, immunology and epidemiology. The center has a graduate training program in collaboration with other institutions, in the areas of biotechnology and infectology, with research laboratories, production units and specialized library. Slotta, a sterol chemist, studied medical applications of snake venom. In 1938, Slotta and his brother-in-law Heinz Fraenkel-Conrat isolated crotoxin from venom, the first snake toxin to be isolated in crystalline form. Their research suggested that the toxicity of crotoxin was due to effects on nerve lipids. He subsequently co-founded a biopharmaceutical company.

On May 3, 1948, Slotta traveled from Santos, Brazil, aboard the steamer S.S. Argentina, arriving at the Port of New York, May 17, 1948, with his wife Maja Slotta and daughter.

They were bound for Berkeley, California, where Maja's brother, Heinz, had relocated.

After moving to Miami, Florida, with his wife and son in 1956, Slotta unsuccessfully looked for a polio cure using venom. Slotta purified the most basic polypeptide from cobra venom, known as direct lytic factor, and with James Vick identified this as a cardiotoxin.

In 1956, Slotta was appointed research professor of biochemistry at the University of Miami, in Coral Gables Florida. Slotta became a naturalized United States citizen March 30, 1961, in Miami, Florida. He died in 1987 in Coral Gables, Florida.

== Family ==
On July 16, 1927, Karl Slotta married Maja Fraenkel, PhD, daughter of Professor Ludwig Fraenkel (1870–1951) and Lili Conrat, in Breslau, Germany.

Ludwig Fraenkel was a prominent gynecologist and medical researcher in Breslau, Germany. Fraenkel's daughter, Maja Fraenkel (Slotta) was an economist, talented pianist, and author of a paper, published in 1928 addressing Zur Frage der psychotechnischen Eignungsprüfung für den Chemikerberuf.

The couple met through Slotta's work with Professor Frankel.

Maja at the time was associated with the Psychotechnisches Institute beim Berufsami der Stadt Breslau. Her own career as a researcher was largely redirected to a supportive role after the birth of two children.

After immigration to the United States in 1956, she was an early organizer of the Medical Faculty Wives Medical Student Loan Fund, established under auspices of the Medical Faculty Association of the University of Miami (of which her husband was a member, as research professor of biochemistry and medicine). Maja Slotta identified and secured federal funds that matched donations nine to one, thereby facilitating the early growth of this fund. Providing funds and assistance to the medical students became the primary endeavor of the group. The project has since grown into a successful scholarship endowment. Maja resumed research after raising her children and was co-author of a 1961 study on The Impact of Airports on the Economy of Southeastern Florida, published by University of Miami Bureau of Business and Economic Research.

Maja Fraenkel's brother was the biochemist Heinz Fraenkel-Conrat (1910–1999).

== Sources ==
- Bettendorf, Professor Dr Gerhard (1995-01-01). "Slotta, Karl Heinrich". In Bettendorf, Professor Dr Gerhard (ed.). Zur Geschichte der Endokrinologie und Reproduktionsmedizin. Springer Berlin Heidelberg. pp. 535–538. doi:10.1007/978-3-642-79152-9_217. ISBN 9783642791536.
- American Men & Women of Science. A biographical directory of today's leaders in physical, biological, and related sciences. 16th edition. Eight volumes. New York: R.R. Bowker, 1986. (AmMWSc 16)
- Biography Index. A cumulative index to biographical material in books and magazines. Volume 15: September, 1986-August, 1988. New York: H.W. Wilson Co., 1988. (BioIn 15)
- M. E. Grenander Department of Special Collections & Archives University Libraries / University at Albany / State University of New York, German and Jewish Intellectual Emigre Collection. Slotta, Karl. Interview with Maja Slotta about her husband, Karl, Feb. 15, 1990 (Lee), 1 cass. Slotta, Karl. Interview with Sabine Crozier about her father, Karl Slotta, Jan. 14, 2008, 1 cass.
- New York Times. Obituary. July 21, 1987. Dr. Karl Slotta, a Developer of Birth Control Pills, Dies.
- Miami Herald. Obituary. July 19, 1987,4B Local. "Dr. Karl Slotta, Biochemistry Pioneer."
- Frobenius W., "Ludwig Fraenkel: 'spiritus rector' of the early progesterone research." Eur J Obstet Gynecol Reprod Biol. 1999 Mar; 83(1):115-9.
- Frobenius W., "Ludwig Fraenkel, corpus luteum and discovery of progesterone." Zentralbl Gynakol. 1998; 120(7):317-23.
- Slotta, Karl Heinrich. Chemistry and Biochemistry of Snake Venoms. Springer-Verlag, 1955.
- Slotta, Karl Heinrich. Grundriss der modernen Arzneistoff-Synthese. J.W. Edwards, 1931.
- Proceedings: Student American Veterinary Medical Association Symposium, 1987 : Colorado State University, College of Veterinary Medicine and Biomedical Science; p. civ.
- Kravetz, Nathan. Displaced German Scholars: A Guide to Academics in Peril in Nazi Germany During the 1930s. Borgo Press. 1993.
- Djerassi, Carl. The Pill, Pygmy Chimps, and Degas' Horse: The Autobiography of Carl Djerassi. p 89.
- Weinstein, Scott. Venomous Bites from Non-Venomous Snakes: A Critical Analysis of Risk and Management. p. xiii
