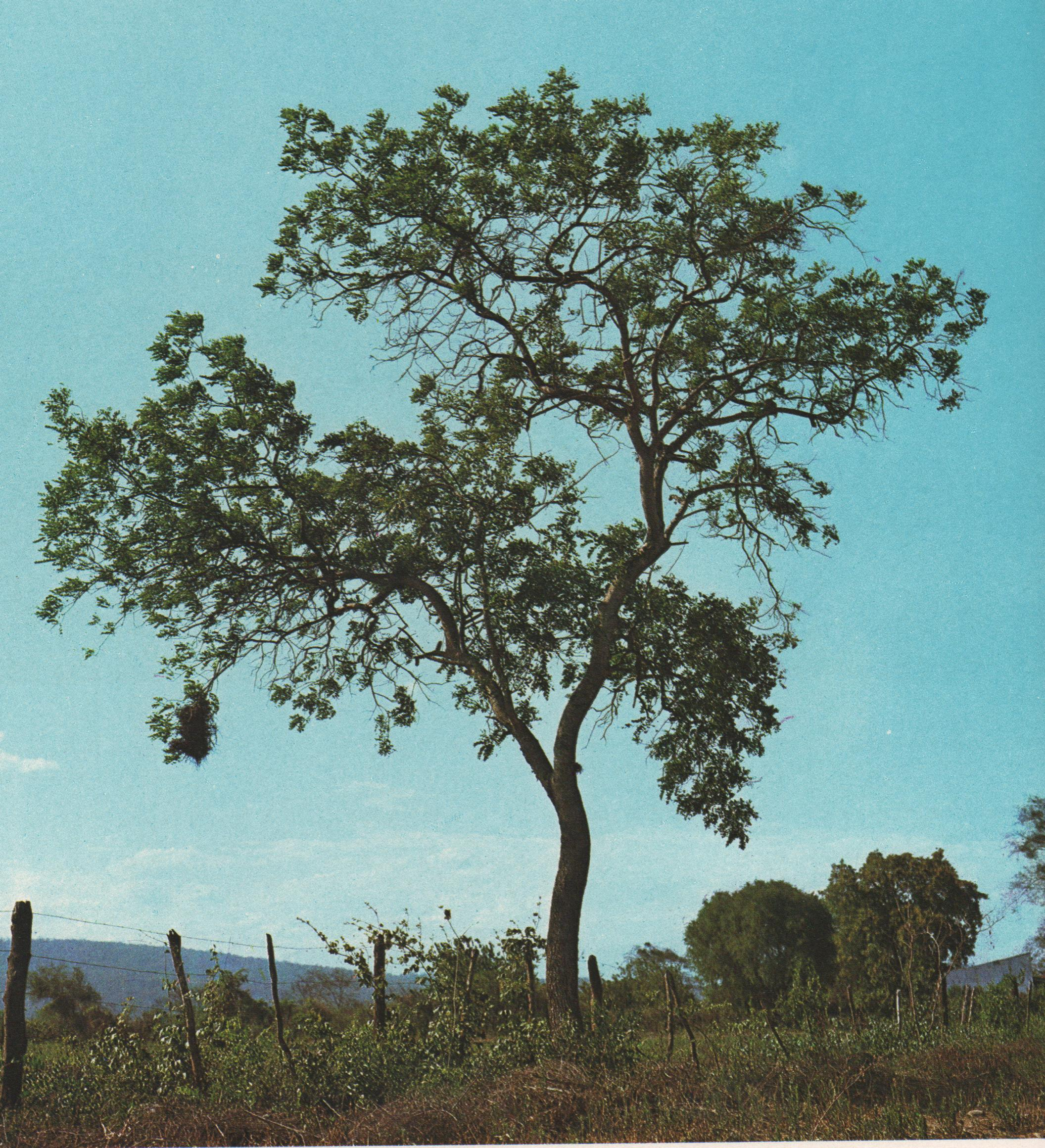

Conservation status
- Near Threatened (IUCN 2.3)

Scientific classification
- Kingdom: Plantae
- Clade: Tracheophytes
- Clade: Angiosperms
- Clade: Eudicots
- Clade: Rosids
- Order: Fabales
- Family: Fabaceae
- Subfamily: Caesalpinioideae
- Tribe: Caesalpinieae
- Genus: Pterogyne; Tul.
- Species: P. nitens

Binomial name
- Pterogyne nitens Tul.

= Pterogyne =

Genus of legumes

Pterogyne is a monotypic genus in the legume family, Fabaceae, subfamily Caesalpinioideae. The sole species is Pterogyne nitens. Spanish common names include guiraró, palo coca, or tipa colorado. In Portuguese, it is commonly known as amendoim bravo, cocal or madeira nova. It is found in Brazil, Paraguay, Bolivia and Argentina. It is threatened by habitat loss and harvesting for timber.

Five guanidine alkaloid natural products were isolated from the leaves of Pterogyne nitens: nitensidine D, nitensidine E, pterogynine, pterogynidine, and galegine.
