= Nitensidine D =

Names
- IUPAC name (E)-2-(3,7-dimethylocta-2,6-dien-1-yl)guanidine
- Other names: geranyl guanidine

Identifiers
CAS Number	1107631-55-9
3D model (JSmol)	Interactive image
ChEMBL	ChEMBL556739
ChemSpider	24623230
PubChem CID	45269644
CompTox Dashboard (EPA)	DTXSID201337254
- InChI: InChI=1S/C11H21N3/c1-9(2)5-4-6-10(3)7-8-14-11(12)13/h5,7H,4,6,8H2,1-3H3,(H4,12,13,14)/b10-7+ Key: WDTUVHUDPPUQMN-JXMROGBWSA-N
- SMILES: CC(=CCC/C(=C/CN=C(N)N)/C)C

Properties
Chemical formula	C_{11}H_{21}N_{3}
Molar mass	195.310 g·mol^{−1}
- Except where otherwise noted, data are given for materials in their standard state (at 25 °C [77 °F], 100 kPa). Infobox references

Nitensidine D is a toxic alkaloid natural product that was isolated from the leaves of the South American legume Pterogyne nitens. It is also hypothesized to be a possible intermediate in the still unknown, seemingly monoterpene based, terrestrial biosynthetic pathway for tetrodotoxin.

== See also ==
- Galegine
