= HL156A =

Chemical compound

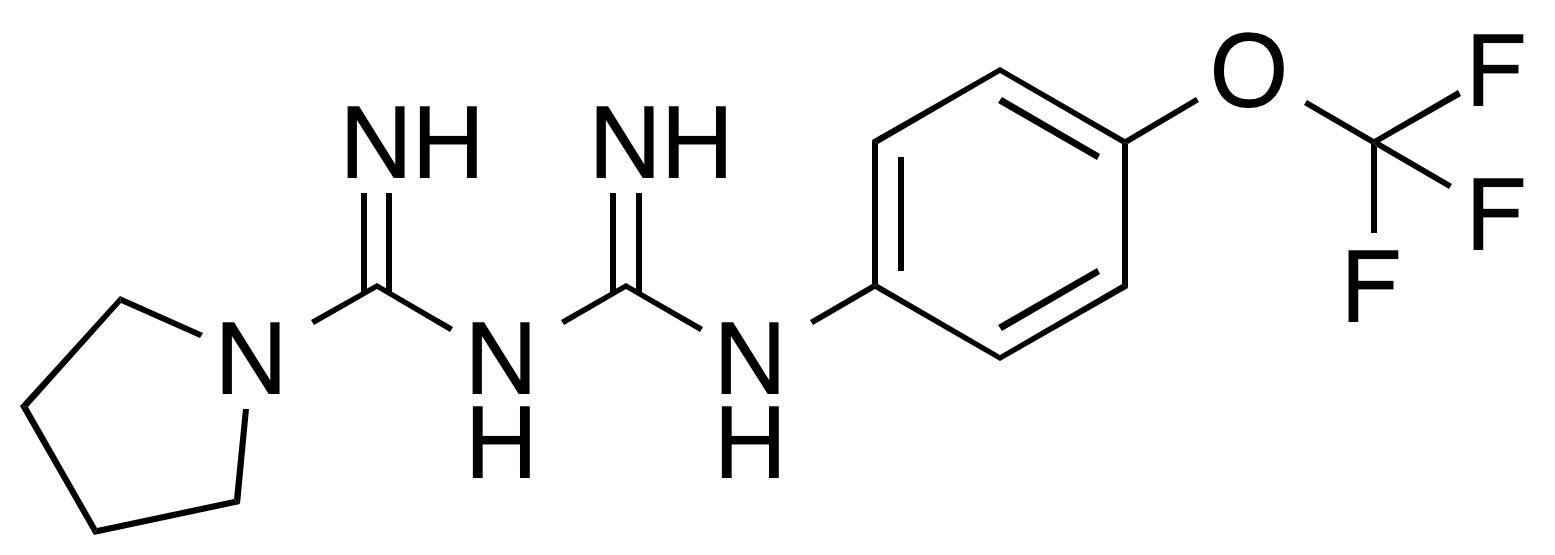

Clinical data
- Other names: IM156, HL271 acetate, UNII-4G3BUV6ZSK

Identifiers
- IUPAC name: N'-[N'-[4-(trifluoromethoxy)phenyl]carbamimidoyl]pyrrolidine-1-carboximidamide
- CAS Number: 1422365-93-2
- PubChem CID: 71512108
- ChemSpider: 92169512
- UNII: 4G3BUV6ZSK
- CompTox Dashboard (EPA): DTXSID501336867

Chemical and physical data
- Formula: C_{13}H_{16}F_{3}N_{5}O
- Molar mass: 315.300 g·mol^{−1}
- 3D model (JSmol): Interactive image
- SMILES: C1CCN(C1)C(=NC(=NC2=CC=C(C=C2)OC(F)(F)F)N)N
- InChI: InChI=1S/C13H16F3N5O/c14-13(15,16)22-10-5-3-9(4-6-10)19-11(17)20-12(18)21-7-1-2-8-21/h3-6H,1-2,7-8H2,(H4,17,18,19,20); Key:NGFUHJWVBKTNOE-UHFFFAOYSA-N

HL156A is an experimental drug being studied for its potential use in cancer treatment. Chemically, it is derivative of metformin and a potent oxidative phosphorylation inhibitor and AMP-activated protein kinase activating biguanide. Certain types of cancer cells requires oxidative phosphorylation to survive. By targeting it, HL156A might help in improving anticancer therapy. It is more potent than acadesine or metformin at activating AMP-activated protein kinase. It is being developed by Hanall Biopharma.

== Research ==
HL156A is in phase 1 clinical trials in patients with advanced solid tumor and lymphoma. It is also being studied in other conditions such as liver and renal fibrosis, cancer and drug resistance in cancer. HL176OUT04, a drug with similar pharmacology, has been also developed.

== Pharmacology ==
Apart from AMP-activated protein kinase activation, it also inhibits expression and activation of insulin-like growth factor-1, protein kinase B, mammalian target of rapamycin (mTOR), and extracellular signal-regulated kinases.

== See also ==
- Phenformin
