= Sitagliptin/simvastatin =

Combination drug

Combination of
- Sitagliptin: antidiabetic DPP-4 inhibitor
- Simvastatin: hypolipidemic statin

Clinical data
- Trade names: Juvisync
- AHFS/Drugs.com: Consumer Drug Information
- ATC code: None

Legal status
- Legal status: US: ℞-only

Identifiers
- CAS Number: 1448892-92-9
- KEGG: D10258

Sitagliptin/simvastatin, sold under the brand name Juvisync, is a fixed-dose combination anti-diabetic medication used to treat type 2 diabetes and hypercholesterolemia. It contains sitagliptin and simvastatin. Sitagliptin is a dipeptidyl peptidase-4 inhibitor and simvastatin is an HMG-CoA reductase inhibitor. These two disorders commonly occur in people at the same time, and have been typically treated with administration of these medications separately. The combination was approved in 2011, and sold under the brand name Juvisync by Merck. Juvisync was later removed from the market in 2013, due to business reasons.

== History ==
In 1991, Merck & Co's simvastatin was approved as an HMG-COA inhibitor to lower the levels of LDL cholesterol. In 2006, Merck & Co's sitagliptin was approved by the FDA for treatment of diabetes mellitus type 2.

== Regulation ==
Juvisync was the first product to combine a cholesterol lowering drug with a type 2 diabetes drug in the same tablet.

== Nonclinical toxicology ==
Sitagliptin: Using male and female rats, a two-year carcinogenicity study was carried out with doses of 50, 150, and 500 mg/kg/day. The 500 mg/kg dose has exposure limits of 60 times what would be seen in the highest dose in humans. At this dose, liver adenoma/carcinoma was seen. Tumors were not seen from the smaller doses. Nomutagenic or clastogenic effects were seen from tests using several assays (CHO, rat, etc.). Fertility studies in rats showed no teratogenic effects.

Simvastatin: No tumorigenic effect was seen in a 72-week carcinogenicity study using mice at the low dose levels. However, at the higher dose levels (eight and 16 times the human dose equivalent), liver carcinomas and adenomas, lung adenomas, and adenomas of the Harderian gland occurred. No mutagenic effects were seen in assays. Testicular atrophy was noted in dogs and rats at four and eight times the human exposure, respectively.

== Limitations of use ==
It should not be used in patients with type 1 diabetes, diabetic ketoacidosis, pancreatitis, Fredrickson types I and V dyslipidemias, and severe renal impairment.

== Drug interactions ==
Juvisync should not be used with: strong CYP3A4 inhibitors, cyclosporine, danazol, gemfibrozil, and other fibrates. Caution should be used and the patient should be monitored if they are taking the following: amiodarone, dronedarone, ranolazine, calcium channel blockers, niacin, digoxin, coumarin anticoagulants, and colchicine.
