= Dibutylhexamethylenediamine =

- Skeletal formula of dibutylhexamethylenediamine

Names
- Preferred IUPAC name N^{1},N^{6}-Dibutylhexane-1,6-diamine
- Other names: N,N′-DibutylhexamethylenediamineN,N’-Dibutylhexanediamine; N,N′-Di-n-butyl-1,6-hexanediamine

Identifiers
CAS Number	4835-11-4
3D model (JSmol)	Interactive image
ChemSpider	19729
ECHA InfoCard	100.023.106
EC Number	225-417-7
MeSH	N,N'-dibutyl-1,6-hexanediamine
PubChem CID	20972
RTECS number	MO1250000
UNII	846A8RML53
UN number	2735
CompTox Dashboard (EPA)	DTXSID6038823
- InChI: InChI=1S/C14H32N2/c1-3-5-11-15-13-9-7-8-10-14-16-12-6-4-2/h15-16H,3-14H2,1-2H3 Key: VZRUGPJUVWRHKM-UHFFFAOYSA-N
- SMILES: CCCCNCCCCCCNCCCC

Properties
Chemical formula	C_{14}H_{32}N_{2}
Molar mass	228.424 g·mol^{−1}
Appearance	Colourless liquid
Density	821 mg mL^{−1}
Boiling point	131 to 133 °C (268 to 271 °F; 404 to 406 K) at 4 hPa
Refractive index (n_{D})	1.451

Hazards
- GHS labelling
Pictograms	(GHS05: Corrosive) (GHS06: Toxic)
Signal word	Danger
Hazard statements	H314, H330
Precautionary statements	P260, P280, P284, P305+P351+P338, P310
Flash point	113 °C (235 °F; 386 K)

Related compounds
Related compounds	Synthalin; Arginylglycylaspartic acid; Gusperimus
- Except where otherwise noted, data are given for materials in their standard state (at 25 °C [77 °F], 100 kPa). Infobox references

N,N’-Dibutylhexamethylenediamine (dibutylhexanediamine) is a chemical compound used in the production of polymers. It is highly toxic upon inhalation, and is listed as an extremely hazardous substance as defined by the U.S. Emergency Planning and Community Right-to-Know Act.

== See also ==
- Hexamethylenediamine
