= Gusperimus =

- Skeletal formula of a gusperimus minor tautomer

Names
- Other names N-[2-[4-(3-Aminopropylamino)butylamino]-1-hydroxy-2-oxoethyl]-7-(diaminomethylideneamino)heptanamide

Identifiers
| CAS Number | 98629-43-7 |
| 3D model (JSmol) | Interactive image |
| ChEMBL | ChEMBL406117; ChEMBL1172736 |
| ChemSpider | 49995; 82420 S |
| KEGG | D08032 |
| MeSH | gusperimus |
| PubChem CID | 55362; 91272 S |
| UNII | UJ0ZJ76DO9 |
| CompTox Dashboard (EPA) | DTXSID60861078 |
- InChI: InChI=1S/C17H37N7O3/c18-9-7-11-21-10-5-6-12-22-15(26)16(27)24-14(25)8-3-1-2-4-13-23-17(19)20/h16,21,27H,1-13,18H2,(H,22,26)(H,24,25)(H4,19,20,23) Key: IDINUJSAMVOPCM-UHFFFAOYSA-N
- SMILES: N=C(N)NCCCCCCC(=O)NC(O)C(=O)NCCCCNCCCN

Properties
| Chemical formula | C_{17}H_{37}N_{7}O_{3} |
| Molar mass | 387.529 g·mol^{−1} |
| log P | −0.933 |
| Acidity (pK_{a}) | 11.588 |
| Basicity (pK_{b}) | 2.409 |

Pharmacology
| ATC code | L04AA19 (WHO) |
| Routes of administration | Intravenous; Subcutaneous |
- Pharmacokinetics
| Bioavailability | 100% |
| Legal status | In general: ℞ (Prescription only) |

Related compounds
| Related compounds | Dibutylhexamethylenediamine; Acetyl hexapeptide-3 |
- Except where otherwise noted, data are given for materials in their standard state (at 25 °C [77 °F], 100 kPa). verify (what is ?) Infobox references

Gusperimus is an immunosuppressive drug. It is a derivative of the naturally occurring HSP70 inhibitor spergualin, and inhibits the interleukin-2-stimulated maturation of T cells to the S and G2/M phases and the polarization of the T cells into IFN-gamma-secreting Th1 effector T cells, resulting in the inhibition of growth of activated naive CD4 T cells.

Gusperimus was developed by Bristol-Myers Squibb. Currently, it is manufactured and sponsored for use as an orphan drug and for clinical studies by the Japanese company Euro Nippon Kayaku. The patent claim (see quotation) is that Gusperimus may be useful for a variety of hyperreactive inflammatory diseases such as autoimmune diseases. The drug is available in vials containing 100 mg each.

There is little information about the pharmacokinetic properties of gusperimus.

== Overview ==
The European Commission assigned orphan drug status to Gusperimus in 2001 for the treatment of granulomatosis with polyangiitis, a serious form of vasculitis frequently associated with permanent disability and/or fatal outcome. There have been many cases of patients resistant to all forms of usual treatment responding very well to Gusperimus.

It has been proposed that gusperimus may benefit patients with the neurological disease amyotrophic lateral sclerosis (ALS or Lou Gehrig's disease). ALS causes permanent motor deficits and disabilities up to the point that almost all motor functions, including breathing and bladder control, are lost. Patients usually have no intellectual impairments. Currently, there are no results from controlled studies in ALS patients.

There have also been positive and negative anecdotal reports in patients with multiple sclerosis. As with ALS, there are no sufficient studies in MS patients.

Gusperimus may possibly be of use in more common diseases and conditions such as rheumatoid arthritis, Crohn's disease, lupus erythematosus, and the prevention and therapy of transplant rejection or graft-versus-host disease.

== Adverse effects ==
Currently, only provisional and preliminary data about side-effects is available. The following side-effects have been noticed so far:

- Dysgeusia (abnormal or bad taste)
- Drug induced leukopenia (very common)
- Significant infections related to therapy.

It is not known if therapy with gusperimus may increase the risk of malignant diseases (lymphoma, leukemia, solid tumors), as is the case with other highly potent immunosuppressant agents such as ciclosporin or tacrolimus.

== Interactions ==
There has been little experience about clinically relevant interactions. These might be:

- Other immunosuppressant drugs : Risk of infections increased.
- Myelotoxic drugs like 6-Mercaptopurin : Risk of serious bone marrow damage increased.
- Certain NSAIDs : Increased risk of hepatotoxic reactions.

== Dosage ==
Gusperimus is used in therapeutic cycles. The daily dose and the length of each cycle as well as the length of the treatment free interval depend on the degree of leukopenia/neutropenia caused by gusperimus. It is recommended to obtain complete WBC (White Blood Cell) counts during and after each cycle frequently.

== Synonyms ==
2Common references are:

- (+−)-15-Deoxyspergualin,
- 1-Amino-19-guanidino-11-hydroxy-4,9,12-triazanonadecane-10,13-dione,
- 15-Deoxyspergualin,
- 15-Deoxyspergualin Hydrochloride,
- 7-{(Aminoiminomethyl)amino]-N-[2-[[4-[(3-aminopropyl)amino]butyl]amino]]-
  1-hydroxy-2-oxoethyl]heptanamide,
- Gusperimus (Trihydrochloride),
- N-[[[4-[(3-Aminopropyl)amino]-butyl]carbamoyl]hydroxymethyl]]-
  7-guanidinoheptanamide,
- Spanidin

== Synthesis ==
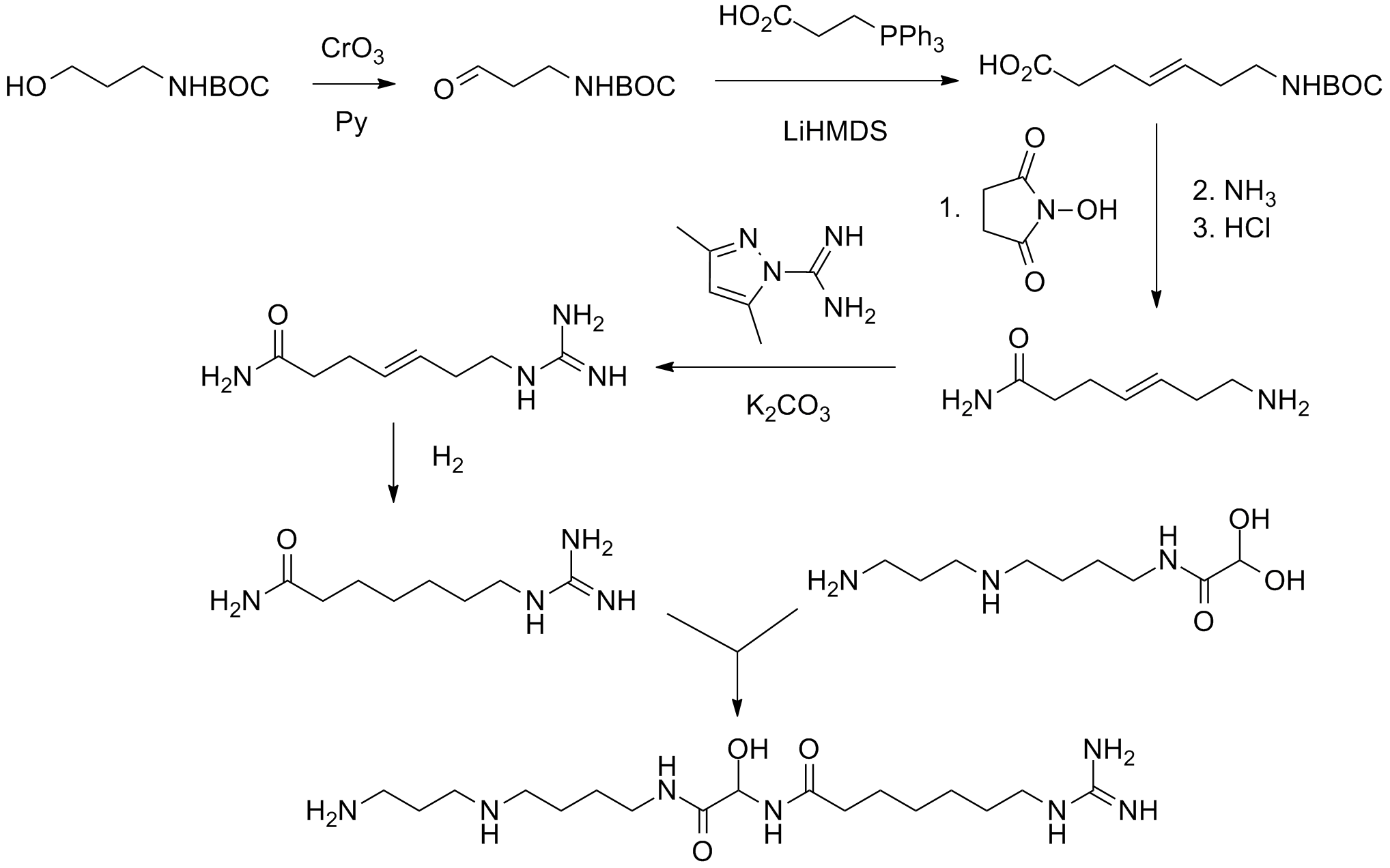
Gusperimus synthesis:

- The BOC derivative of 4-aminobutanol is oxidized with Collins reagent to afford the aldehyde.
- Condensation with the ylide obtained from reaction of 3-triphenylphosphonium propionic acid with lithium hexamethyldisilazane leads to the chain extended acid.
- The carboxylic acid is then activated by conversion to its N-hydroxysuccinimide ester; That group is displaced by ammonia to give the corresponding amide and the BOC group is removed by acid to give the intermediate.
- Treatment of the aminoamide with 1-amidino-3,5-dimethylpyrazole leads to an exchange of the amidine function and formation of the corresponding guanidine.
- The saturated guanidino-amide is obtained by catalytic hydrogenation. Amides are well known to participate in the formation of carbinolamines and aminals.
- Reaction with the glyoxilamide from spermidine (shown as its hydrate) leads to displacement of one of the hydroxyl groups and formation of the corresponding carbinolamine, gusperimus.
