= Acadesine =

Chemical compound

Clinical data
- Other names: 5-Aminoimidazole-4-carboxamide-1-β-D-ribofuranoside, AICA-riboside, AICAR
- ATC code: C01EB13 (WHO)

Identifiers
- IUPAC name: 5-amino-1-[(2R,3R,4S,5R)-3,4-dihydroxy-5-(hydroxymethyl)oxolan-2-yl]-1H-imidazole-4-carboxamide
- CAS Number: 2627-69-2
- PubChem CID: 17513
- IUPHAR/BPS: 5133
- ChemSpider: 16560
- UNII: 53IEF47846
- KEGG: D02742
- ChEBI: CHEBI:28498
- ChEMBL: ChEMBL1551724
- CompTox Dashboard (EPA): DTXSID5046015
- ECHA InfoCard: 100.018.271

Chemical and physical data
- Formula: C_{9}H_{14}N_{4}O_{5}
- Molar mass: 258.234 g·mol^{−1}
- 3D model (JSmol): Interactive image
- SMILES: O=C(c1ncn(c1N)[C@@H]2O[C@@H]([C@@H](O)[C@H]2O)CO)N
- InChI: InChI=1S/C9H14N4O5/c10-7-4(8(11)17)12-2-13(7)9-6(16)5(15)3(1-14)18-9/h2-3,5-6,9,14-16H,1,10H2,(H2,11,17)/t3-,5-,6-,9-/m1/s1; Key:RTRQQBHATOEIAF-UUOKFMHZSA-N

Acadesine (INN), also known as 5-aminoimidazole-4-carboxamide-1-β-D-ribofuranoside, AICA-riboside, and AICAR, is an AMP-activated protein kinase activator which is used for the treatment of acute lymphoblastic leukemia and may have applications in treating other disorders such as diabetes. Acadesine has been used clinically to treat and protect against cardiac ischemic injury. The drug was first used in the 1980s as a method to preserve blood flow to the heart during surgery.

Acadesine is an adenosine regulating agent developed by PeriCor Therapeutics and licensed to Schering-Plough in 2007 for phase III studies. The drug is a potential first-in-class agent for prevention of reperfusion injury in CABG surgery. Schering began patient enrollment in phase III studies in May 2009. The trial was terminated in late 2010 based on an interim futility analysis.

== Medical uses ==
A brief period of coronary arterial occlusion followed by reperfusion prior to prolonged ischemia is known as preconditioning. It has been shown that this is protective. Preconditioning preceded myocardial infarction, may delay cell death and allow for greater salvage of myocardium through reperfusion therapy. AICAR has been shown to precondition the heart shortly before or during ischemia. AICAR triggers a preconditioned anti-inflammatory state by increasing NO production from endothelial nitric oxide synthase. When AICAR is given 24 hours prior to reperfusion, it prevents post ischemic leukocyte-endothelial cell adhesive interactions with increased NO production. AICAR-dependent preconditioning is also mediated by an ATP-sensitive potassium channel and hemeoxygenase-dependent mechanism. It increases AMPK-dependent recruitment of ATP-sensitive K channels to the sarcolemma causing the action potential duration to shorten, and preventing calcium overload during reperfusion. The decrease in calcium overload prevents inflammation activation by ROS. AICAR also increases AMPK-dependent glucose uptake through translocation of GLUT-4 which is beneficial for the heart during post-ischemic reperfusion. The increase in glucose during AICAR preconditioning lengthens the period for preconditioning up to 2 hours in rabbits and 40 minutes in humans undergoing coronary ligation. As a result, AICAR reduces the frequency and size of myocardial infarcts up to 25% in humans allowing improved blood flow to the heart. As well, the treatment has been shown to decrease the risk of an early death and improve recovery after surgery from an ischemic injury.

== Pharmacology ==
Acadesine acts as an AMP-activated protein kinase agonist. It stimulates glucose uptake and increases the activity of p38 mitogen-activated protein kinases α and β in skeletal muscle tissue, as well as suppressing apoptosis by reducing production of reactive oxygen compounds inside the cell.

== Chemistry ==
Reaction of 2-bromo tribenzoyl ribose with diaminomaleonitrile results in the displacement of the anomeric halogen by one of the amino groups and the formation of the aminosugar largely as the β-anomer. Treatment of this product with methyl orthoformate in the presence of a base leads to the replacement of the alkoxy groups in orthoformate by the adjacent amines, resulting in the formation of the imidazole ring. Reaction with alkoxide then converts the nitrile nearest the sugar to an iminoester; the benzoyl groups are cleaved in the process. Hofmann rearrangement in the presence of a bromine and a base converts the iminoester to the corresponding primary amine. Basic hydrolysis then converts the remaining nitrile to an amide, affording acadesine.

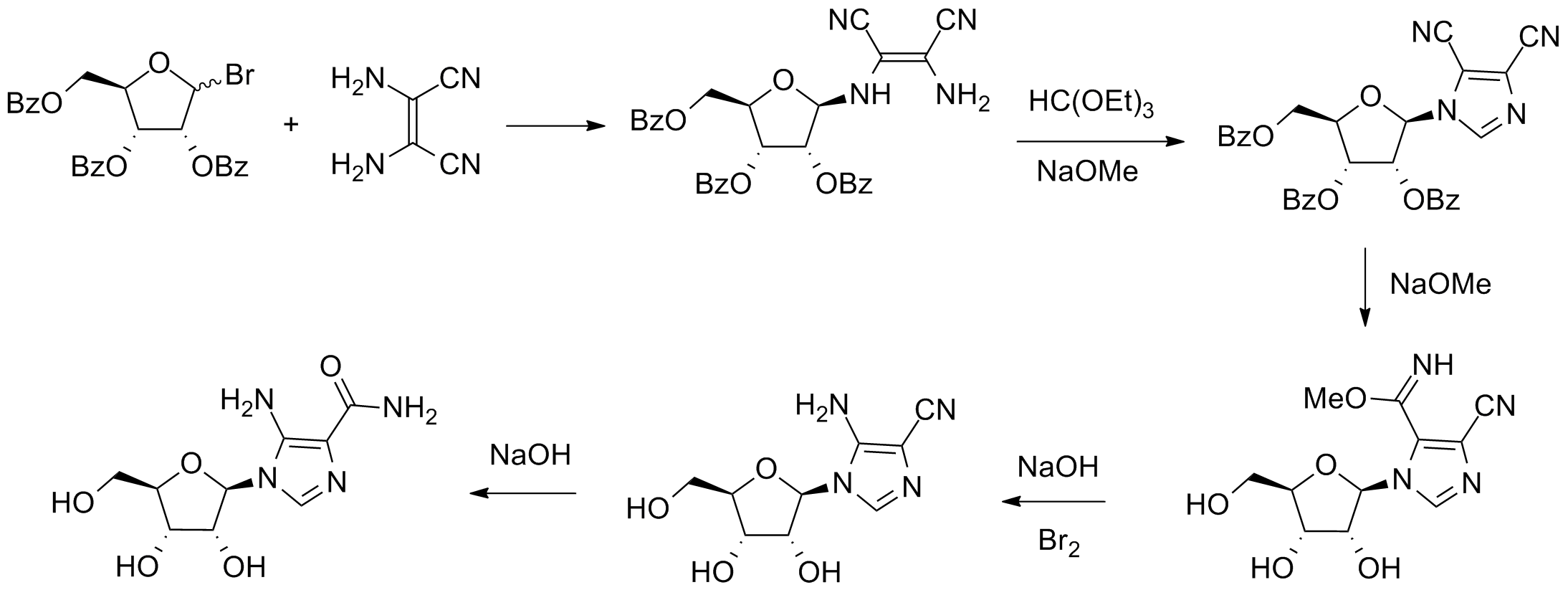
Acadesine synthesis

== Research ==
In 2008, researchers at the Salk Institute discovered that acadesine injected in mice significantly improved their performance in endurance-type exercise, apparently by converting fast-twitch muscle fibers to the more energy-efficient, fat-burning, slow-twitch type. They also looked at the administration of GW501516 (also called GW1516) in combination with acadesine. Given to mice that did not exercise, this combination activated 40% of the genes that were turned on when mice were given GW1516 and made to exercise. This result drew attention to the compound as a possible athletic endurance aid. One of the lead researchers from this study has developed a urine test to detect it and has made the test available to the International Olympic Committee, and the World Anti-Doping Agency (WADA) has added acadesine to the prohibited list from 2009 onwards. The British Medical Journal reported in 2009 that WADA had found evidence that acadesine was used by cyclists in the 2009 Tour de France.

== See also ==
- HL156A
