= Pioglitazone/metformin =

Combination drug

Combination of
- Pioglitazone: Thiazolidinedione
- Metformin: Biguanide

Clinical data
- Trade names: Actoplus Met, Piomet, Politor, others
- AHFS/Drugs.com: Professional Drug Facts
- License data: US DailyMed: Pioglitazone and metformin
- Routes of administration: By mouth
- ATC code: A10BD05 (WHO)

Legal status
- Legal status: UK: POM (Prescription only); US: ℞-only; EU: Rx-only; In general: ℞ (Prescription only)

Identifiers
- CAS Number: 737811-27-7
- KEGG: D09744

Pioglitazone/metformin, sold under the brand name Actoplus Met among others, is a fixed-dose combination anti-diabetic medication used to improve glycemic control in adults with type 2 diabetes. It contains pioglitazone, a thiazolidinedione, and metformin, a biguanide.

== Mechanisms ==
- Pioglitazone is a member of the thiazolidinedione class, it decreases insulin resistance in the periphery and in the liver resulting in increased insulin dependent glucose disposal and decreased hepatic glucose output.
- Metformin is a member of the biguanide class, improves glucose tolerance in patients with type 2 diabetes, lowering both basal and postprandial plasma glucose. Metformin decreases hepatic glucose production, decreases intestinal absorption of glucose and improves insulin sensitivity by increasing peripheral glucose uptake and utilization.

== Indication ==
Pioglitazone/metformin is indicated as an adjunct to diet and exercise:

- To improve glycemic control in patients with type 2 diabetes, or
- For patients who are already treated with a separate combination of pioglitazone and metformin,
- For patients whose diabetes is not adequately controlled with metformin alone, or
- For patients who have initially responded to pioglitazone alone and require additional glycemic control.

== Dosage and administration ==
=== Use in pregnancy and lactation ===
Pioglitazone/metformin should not be used during pregnancy unless the potential benefit justifies the potential risk to the fetus. There are no adequate and well-controlled studies in pregnant women with combination of pioglitazone and metformin or its individual components. It is not known whether pioglitazone and/or metformin are secreted in human milk. Because many drugs are excreted in human milk, pioglitazone/metformin should not be administered to a breastfeeding woman.

=== Precautions ===
Pioglitazone/metformin should not be used in people with type 1 diabetes or for the treatment of diabetic ketoacidosis and should be used with caution in people with edema. Serum ALT levels should be evaluated prior to the initiation of therapy with combination of pioglitazone and metformin and periodically thereafter per the clinical judgment of the health care professional.

== Side-effects ==
The most common side-effects are upper respiratory tract infection, diarrhea, combined edema/peripheral edema and headache, respectively. Most clinical adverse events were similar between groups treated with pioglitazone in combination with metformin and those treated with pioglitazone monotherapy.

== Contraindications ==
Pioglitazone/metformin is contraindicated in people with known hypersensitivity to any components of this combination. These combination also contraindicated in renal disease which may also result from conditions, e.g., acute myocardial infarction, sepsis, acute or chronic metabolic acidosis, including diabetic ketoacidosis, with or without coma.

== Drug interaction ==
Pioglitazone/metformin may interact with furosemide, nifedipine, cationic drugs (e.g., amiloride, digoxin, morphine, procainamide, quinidine, quinine, ranitidine, triamterene, trimethoprim, and vancomycin) and certain drugs tend to produce hyperglycemia and may lead to loss of glycemic control (e.g., thiazides and other diuretics, corticosteroids, phenothiazines, thyroid products, estrogens, oral contraceptives, phenytoin, nicotinic acid, sympathomimetics, calcium channel blocking drugs, and isoniazid).
