= Sitagliptin/metformin =

Pharmaceutical drug

Combination of
- Sitagliptin: Dipeptidyl peptidase-4 inhibitor
- Metformin: Biguanide

Clinical data
- Trade names: Janumet, Januet, others
- AHFS/Drugs.com: Professional Drug Facts
- License data: US DailyMed: Sitagliptin and metformin
- Pregnancy category: AU: C
- Routes of administration: By mouth
- ATC code: A10BD07 (WHO)

Legal status
- Legal status: AU: S4 (Prescription only); CA: ℞-only; UK: POM (Prescription only); US: ℞-only; EU: Rx-only; In general: ℞ (Prescription only)

Identifiers
- KEGG: D10261

Sitagliptin/metformin, sold under the brand name Janumet among others, is a fixed-dose combination anti-diabetic medication used to treat type 2 diabetes. It may be used in those whose blood sugar is not controlled with metformin and a sulfonylurea. It is taken by mouth.

Common side effects include diarrhea, headache, and upper respiratory tract infections. Serious side effects may include lactic acidosis, pancreatitis, low blood sugar, heart failure, joint pain, and allergic reactions. It has not been properly studied in women who are pregnant or breastfeeding. It contains sitagliptin (a dipeptidyl peptidase-4 inhibitor) and metformin (a biguanide).

The combination was approved for medical use in the United States in 2007. In 2022, it was the 182nd most commonly prescribed medication in the United States, with more than 2 million prescriptions. It is available as a generic medication.

== Medical uses ==
In the United States, sitagliptin/metformin is indicated as an adjunct to diet and exercise to improve glycemic control in adults with type 2 diabetes.

In the European Union, sitagliptin/metformin is indicated as an adjunct to diet and exercise to improve glycemic control in people with type 2 diabetes; in combination with a sulfonylurea as an adjunct to diet and exercise "in people inadequately controlled on their maximal tolerated dose of metformin and a sulfonylurea; as triple combination therapy with a peroxisome proliferator-activated receptor (PPAR) agonist (i.e., a thiazolidinedione) as an adjunct to diet and exercise in people inadequately controlled on their maximal tolerated dose of metformin and a PPAR agonist; and as add-on to insulin as an adjunct to diet and exercise to improve glycemic control in people when stable dosage of insulin and metformin alone do not provide adequate glycemic control."

In December 2020, the U.S. Food and Drug Administration (FDA) approved labeling changes stating that Januvia (sitagliptin), Janumet (sitagliptin and metformin hydrochloride), and Janumet XR (sitagliptin and metformin hydrochloride extended-release) are not proven to improve glycemic (blood sugar) control in children aged 10 to 17 with type 2 diabetes. The drugs are approved to improve blood sugar control in adults aged 18 and older with type 2 diabetes.

== Society and culture ==
=== Brand names ===
As of 2018, the combination is marketed under several brand names, including Efficib, Janmet, Januet, Janumet, Jznumet, Ristaben Met, Ristfor, Siglimet, Sitamet, Sitar-M, Sliptin-M, Treviamet, Velmetia, Istamet, Emsita, Sitaglyn, Sitazit-M, and Zaxoran.
