= French lilac =

French lilac is a common name for several plants and may refer to:

- Syringa vulgaris of the family Oleaceae
- Galega officinalis, of the family Papilionaceae
