= Galegine =

Names
- IUPAC name 2-(3-Methylbut-2-enyl)guanidine
- Other names: Isopentenyl guanidine; Dimethylallylguanidine; Isoamylene guanidine

Identifiers
CAS Number	543-83-9
3D model (JSmol)	Interactive image
ChEBI	CHEBI:5265
ChEMBL	ChEMBL111469
ChemSpider	10518
KEGG	C08303
PubChem CID	10983
UNII	R469KQG1EF
CompTox Dashboard (EPA)	DTXSID10202659
- InChI: InChI=1S/C6H13N3/c1-5(2)3-4-9-6(7)8/h3H,4H2,1-2H3,(H4,7,8,9) Key: UVMLHMAIUVSYOL-UHFFFAOYSA-N
- SMILES: CC(=CCN=C(N)N)C

Properties
Chemical formula	C_{6}H_{13}N_{3}
Molar mass	127.191 g·mol^{−1}
- Except where otherwise noted, data are given for materials in their standard state (at 25 °C [77 °F], 100 kPa). Infobox references

Galegine is a toxic chemical compound that has been isolated from Galega officinalis. It has also been found to be the principal cause of the toxicity of poison sedge (Schoenus asperocarpus).

Galegine was used in the 1920s as a pharmaceutical treatment for diabetes; however, because of its toxicity, its use was soon supplanted by superior alternatives. Research on galegine eventually led to the development of metformin which is used today for treatment of type 2 diabetes.

== See also ==
- Nitensidine D
