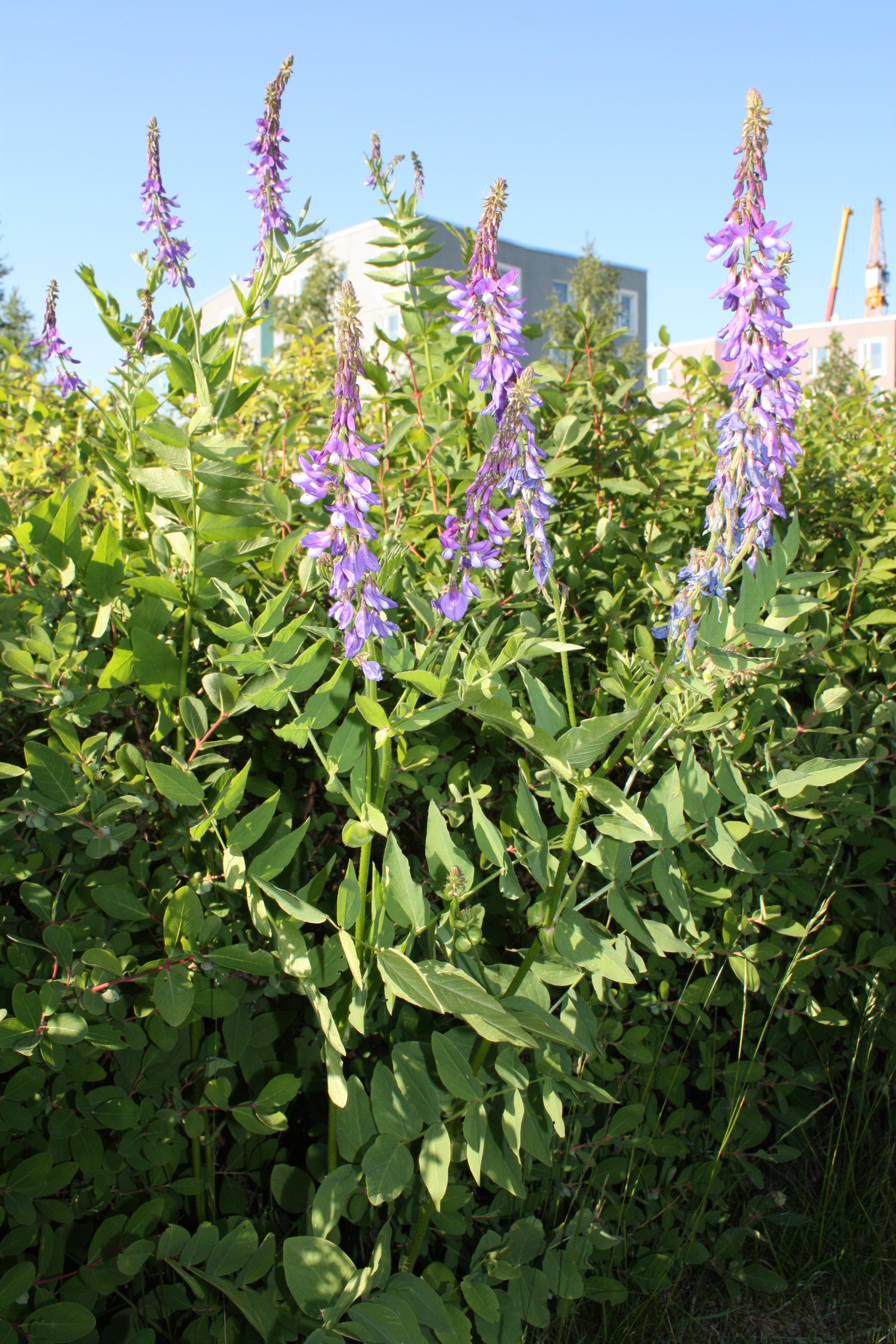
- G. orientalis, University of Helsinki Botanical Garden

Scientific classification
- Kingdom: Plantae
- Clade: Tracheophytes
- Clade: Angiosperms
- Clade: Eudicots
- Clade: Rosids
- Order: Fabales
- Family: Fabaceae
- Subfamily: Faboideae
- Tribe: Galegeae
- Genus: Galega; Tourn. ex L. (1753)

Species
- 8; see text

Synonyms
- Accorombona Endl. (1841); Callotropis G.Don (1832)

= Galega =

Genus of leguminous plants

Galega, goat's rue, is a genus of flowering plants in the legume family, Fabaceae, native to central and southern Europe, western Asia and tropical east Africa. They are tall, bushy, herbaceous perennials with erect racemes of pea-like flowers in shades of white, pink, blue or mauve. Their preferred habitats are sunny damp meadows or slopes.

The species Galega officinalis and Galega orientalis are familiar in cultivation. Numerous cultivars and garden hybrids have also been produced, of which G. × hartlandii 'Lady Wilson' (bicoloured blue and white) and the white-flowered G. × hartlandii 'Alba' have both gained the Royal Horticultural Society's Award of Garden Merit.

There are 6 to 8 species in the genus.

Eight species are accepted:

- Galega africana Mill.
- Galega assyriaca Mouterde
- Galega battiscombei (Baker f.) J.B.Gillett
- Galega cirujanoi Garcia Mur. & Talavera
- Galega lindblomii (Harms) J.B.Gillett
- Galega officinalis L. - goat's rue, professor-weed
- Galega orientalis Lam. - fodder galega
- Galega somalensis (Taub. ex Harms) J.B.Gillett
