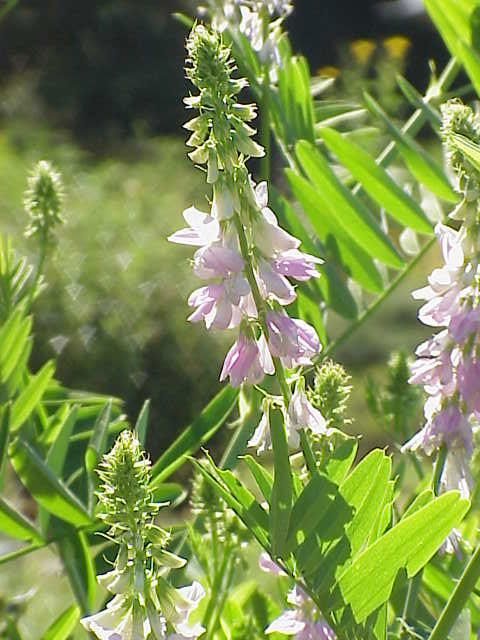

Scientific classification
- Kingdom: Plantae
- Clade: Tracheophytes
- Clade: Angiosperms
- Clade: Eudicots
- Clade: Rosids
- Order: Fabales
- Family: Fabaceae
- Subfamily: Faboideae
- Genus: Galega
- Species: G. officinalis

Binomial name
- Galega officinalis L.

Synonyms
- List: Accorombona tricolor (Hook.) Benth. ex Walp. (1842); Callotropis tricolor (Hook.) G.Don (1832); Galega alba Schult. (1809); Galega bicolor Boiss. & Hausskn. (1868); Galega biloba Sweet (1826); Galega coronilloides Freyn & Sint. (1893); Galega officinalis var. albiflora Halácsy (1900); Galega patula Steven (1856); Galega persica Pers. (1807); Galega tricolor Hook. (1825); Galega vulgaris Lam. (1779); Tephrosia tricolor (Hook.) Sweet (1830)

= Galega officinalis =

Species of flowering plant in the pea family

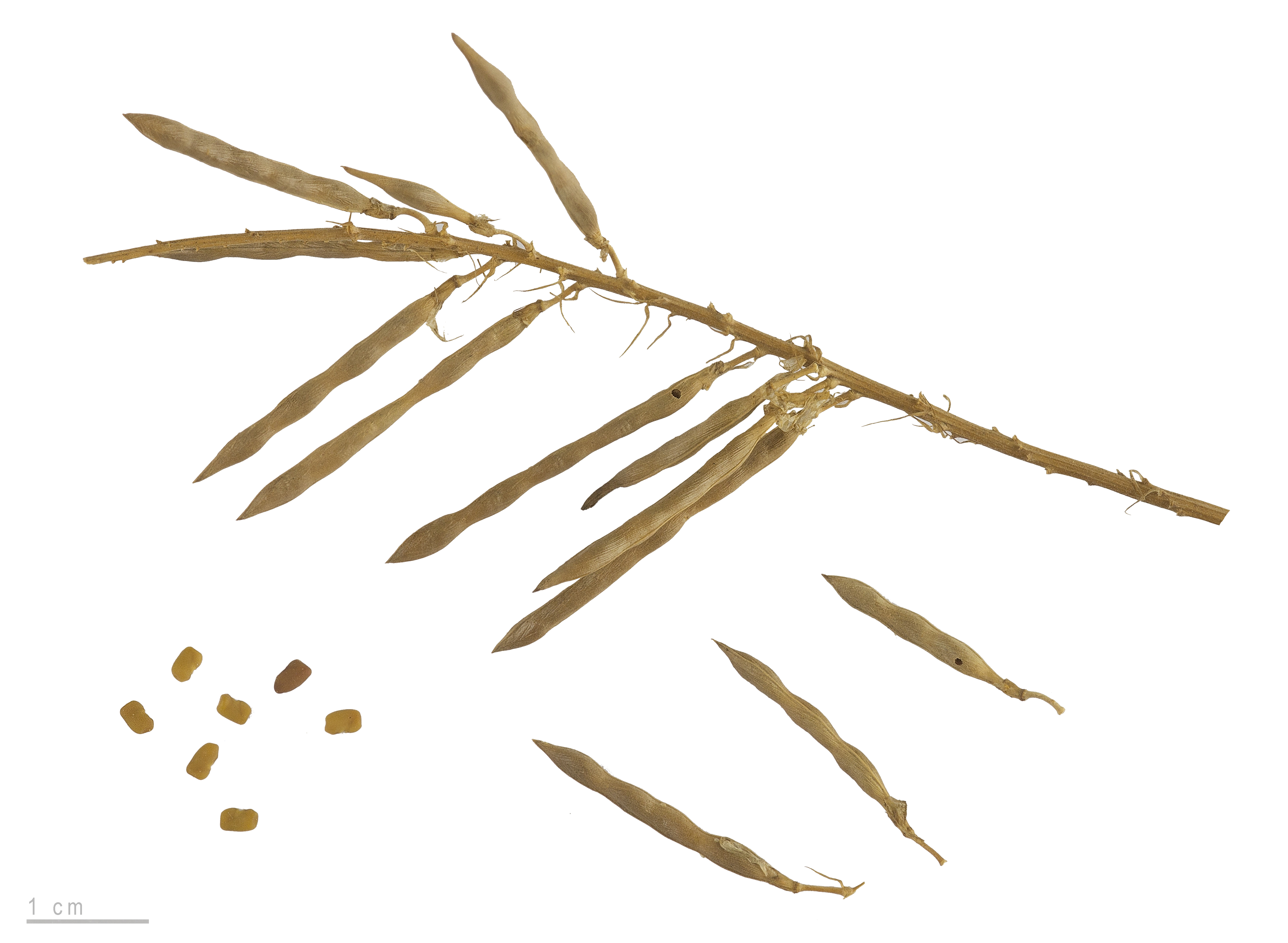
Seeds

Galega officinalis, commonly known as galega or goat's-rue, is a herbaceous plant in the subfamily Faboideae of the legume family Fabaceae. It is native to parts of northern Africa, western Asia and Europe, but is widely cultivated and naturalised elsewhere. The plant has been extensively cultivated as a forage crop, an ornamental, a bee plant, and as green manure.

G. officinalis is rich in galegine, a substance with blood glucose-lowering activity and the foundation for the discovery of metformin, a treatment for managing symptoms of diabetes mellitus. In ancient herbalism, goat's-rue was used as a diuretic. It can be poisonous to mammals, but is a food for various insects.

== Etymology ==
The English name "goat's-rue" is a translation of the Latin Ruta capraria, used for the plant in 1554 when it was considered to be related to Ruta graveolens, or common rue. The Latin specific epithet officinalis refers to plants with some medicinal, culinary or herbal attributes.

Galega bicolor is a synonym.

== Distribution and habitat ==
Widely distributed throughout temperate regions of the world, predominantly in Europe, the plant is a hardy perennial that blooms in the summer months on grasslands, wetlands, and riverbanks, and is classified as an invasive weed in many parts of North America. It has also been found in South America, North Africa, Pakistan, Turkey, and New Zealand.

In 1891 in the United States, Galega officinalis was introduced experimentally at Utah State University for potential use as a forage crop, but escaped cultivation and is now an agricultural pest. As a result, it has been placed on the Federal Noxious Weed List in the United States. It was collected in Colorado, Connecticut and New York prior to the 1930s, and in Maine and Pennsylvania in the 1960s, but the populations appear to have died out.

== Chemistry and herbalism ==
Although not thoroughly studied with 21st century methods, G. officinalis has been analyzed for its constituents, which include galegine, hydroxygalegine, several guanidine derivatives, such as 4-hydroxygalegine flavones, flavone glycosides, kaempferol, and quercetin. In addition to its purported effect to lower blood glucose levels and induce diuresis, goat's rue was used as a herbal tonic in folk medicine practices of medieval Europe to treat bubonic plague, worms, and snake bites.

=== Relation to metformin ===
Once used in traditional medicine over centuries, G. officinalis is at the foundation of the biguanide class of antidiabetic drugs, which also included phenformin and buformin (both discontinued).

G. officinalis contains the phytochemicals, galegine and guanidine, both of which decrease blood sugar, but were discovered to cause adverse effects in human studies. The study of galegine and related molecules in the first half of the 20th century led to development of oral antidiabetic drugs. Research on other compounds related to guanidine, including biguanide, led ultimately to the discovery of metformin (trade name, Glucophage), used in the 21st century for management of diabetes by decreasing liver glucose production and increasing insulin sensitivity of body tissues.

=== Adverse effects ===
Goat's rue may interfere with prescribed diabetes drugs, iron absorption, and anticoagulants. It may cause headache or muscular weakness, and its safety during pregnancy or breastfeeding is unknown.

== Gallery ==
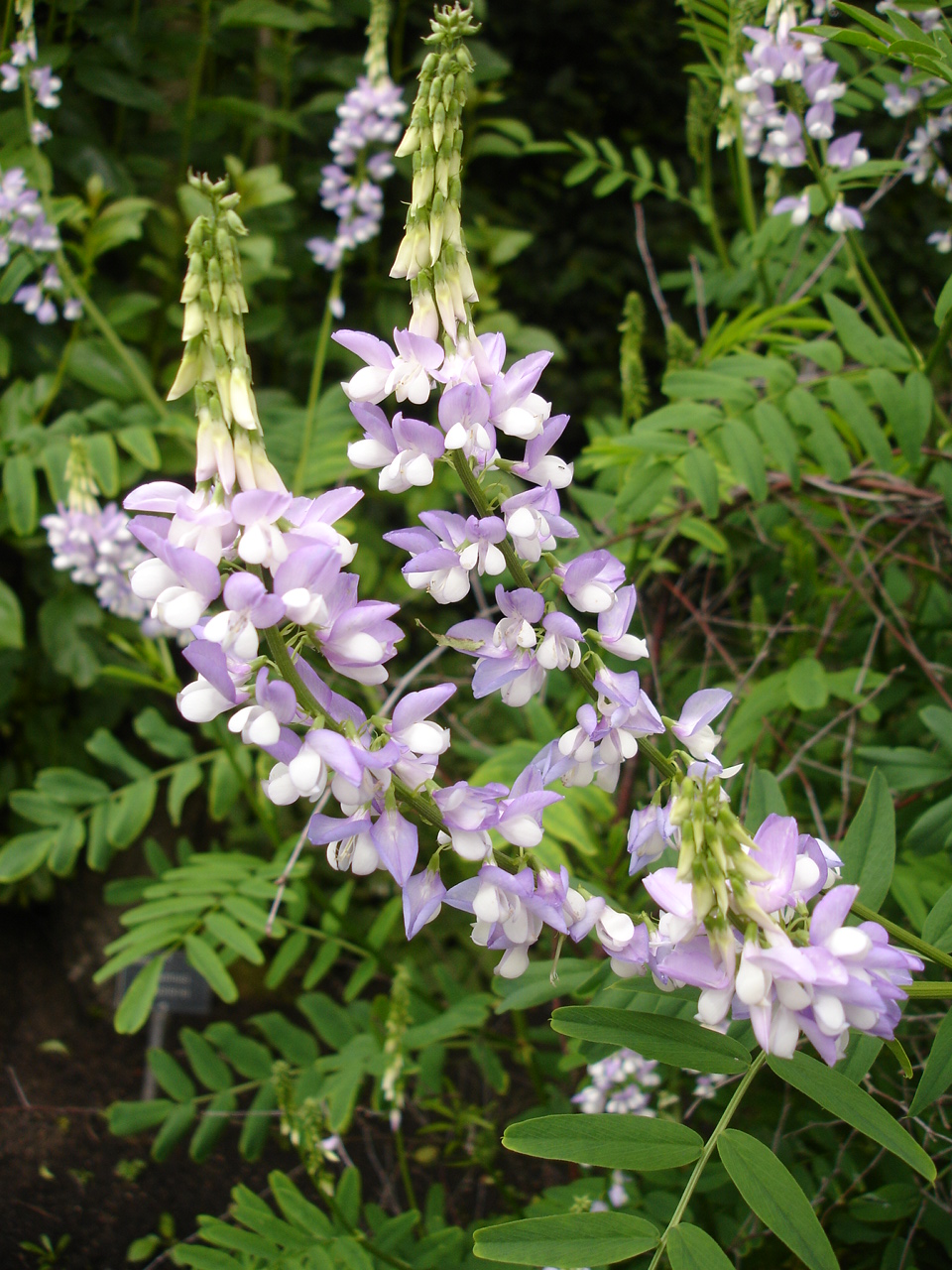
Galega officinalis, a natural source of galegine

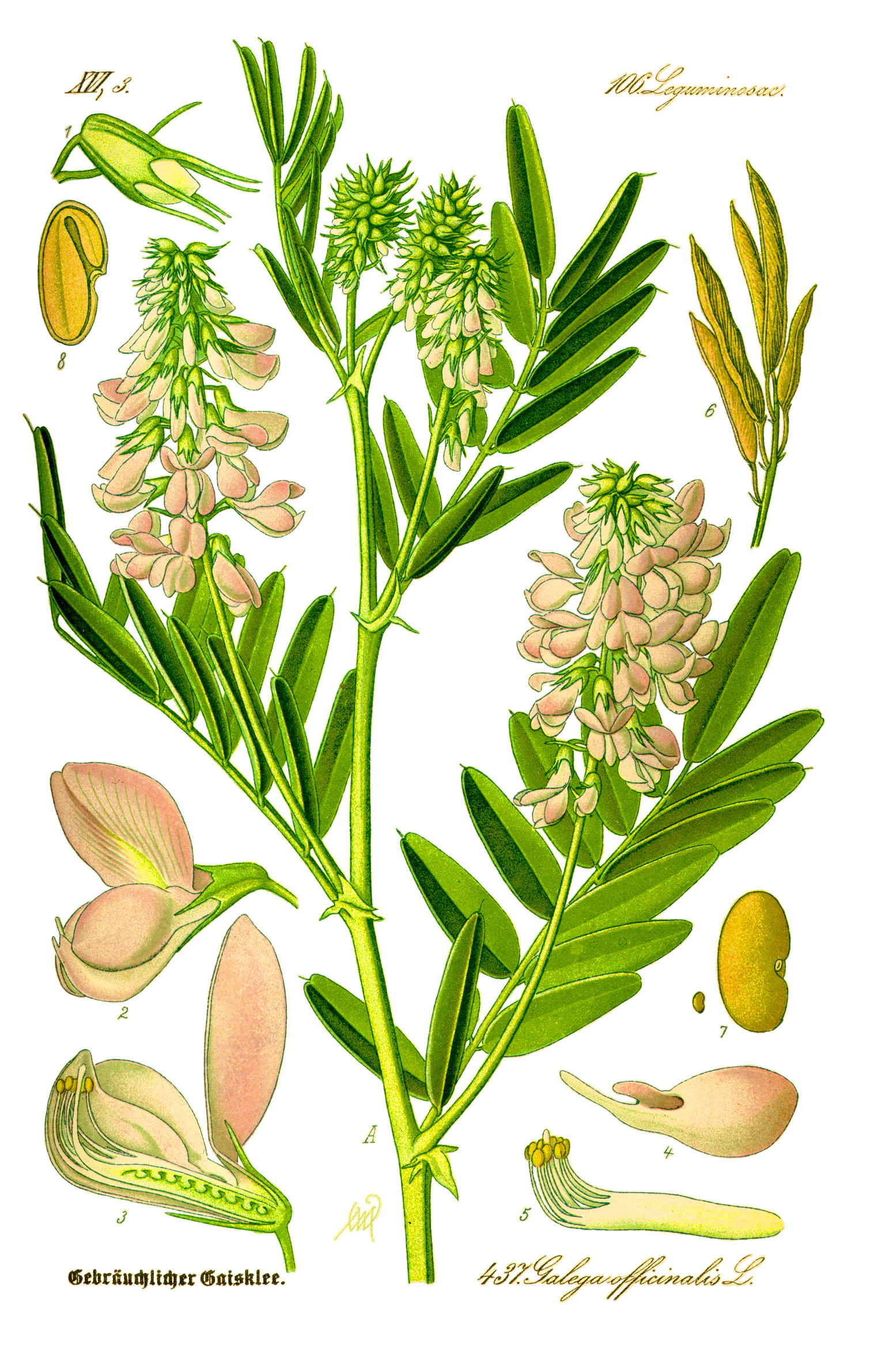
Galega officinalis - from Thomé, Flora von Deutschland, Österreich und der Schweiz 1885

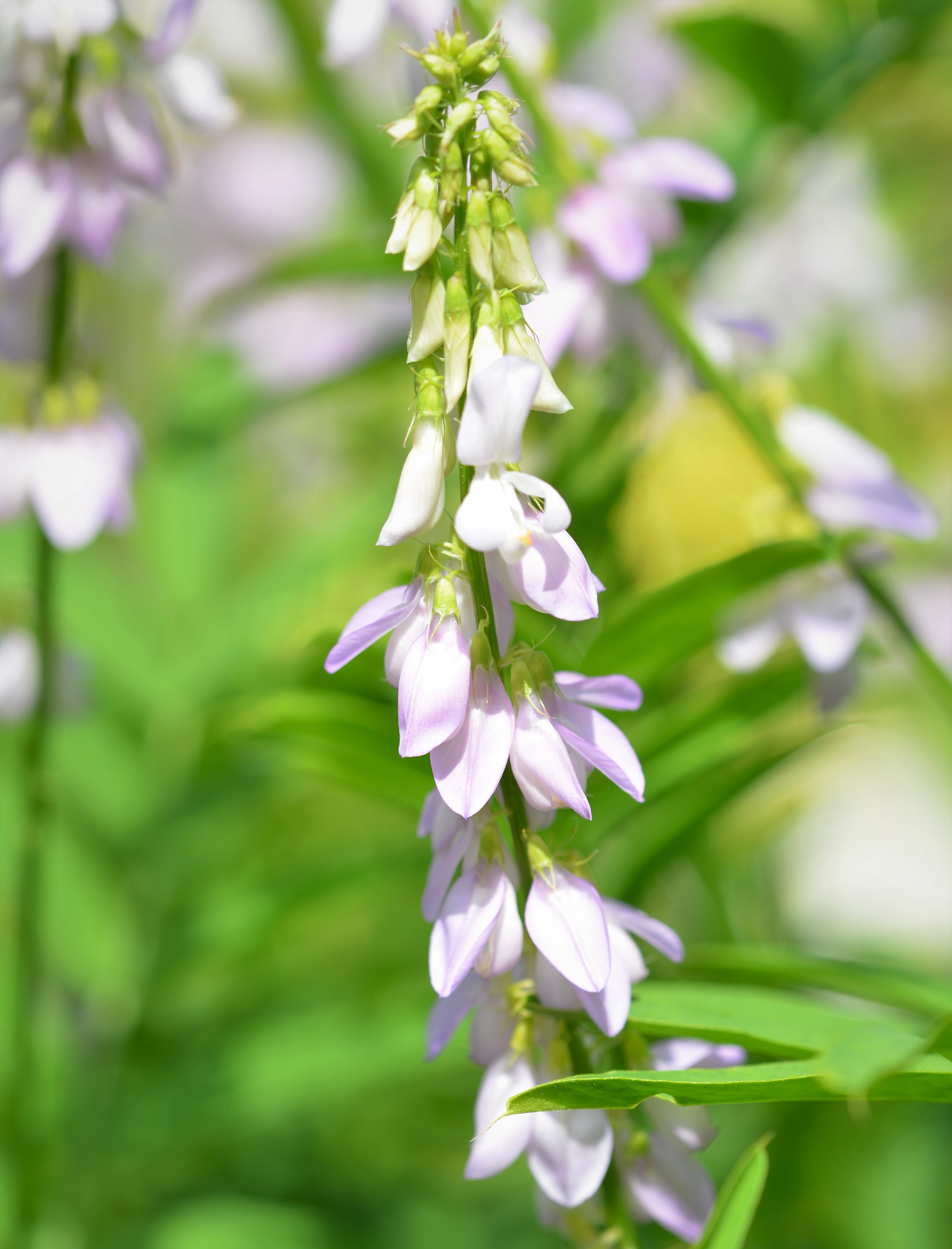
Galega officinalis - Hortus Eystettensis, Eichstätt

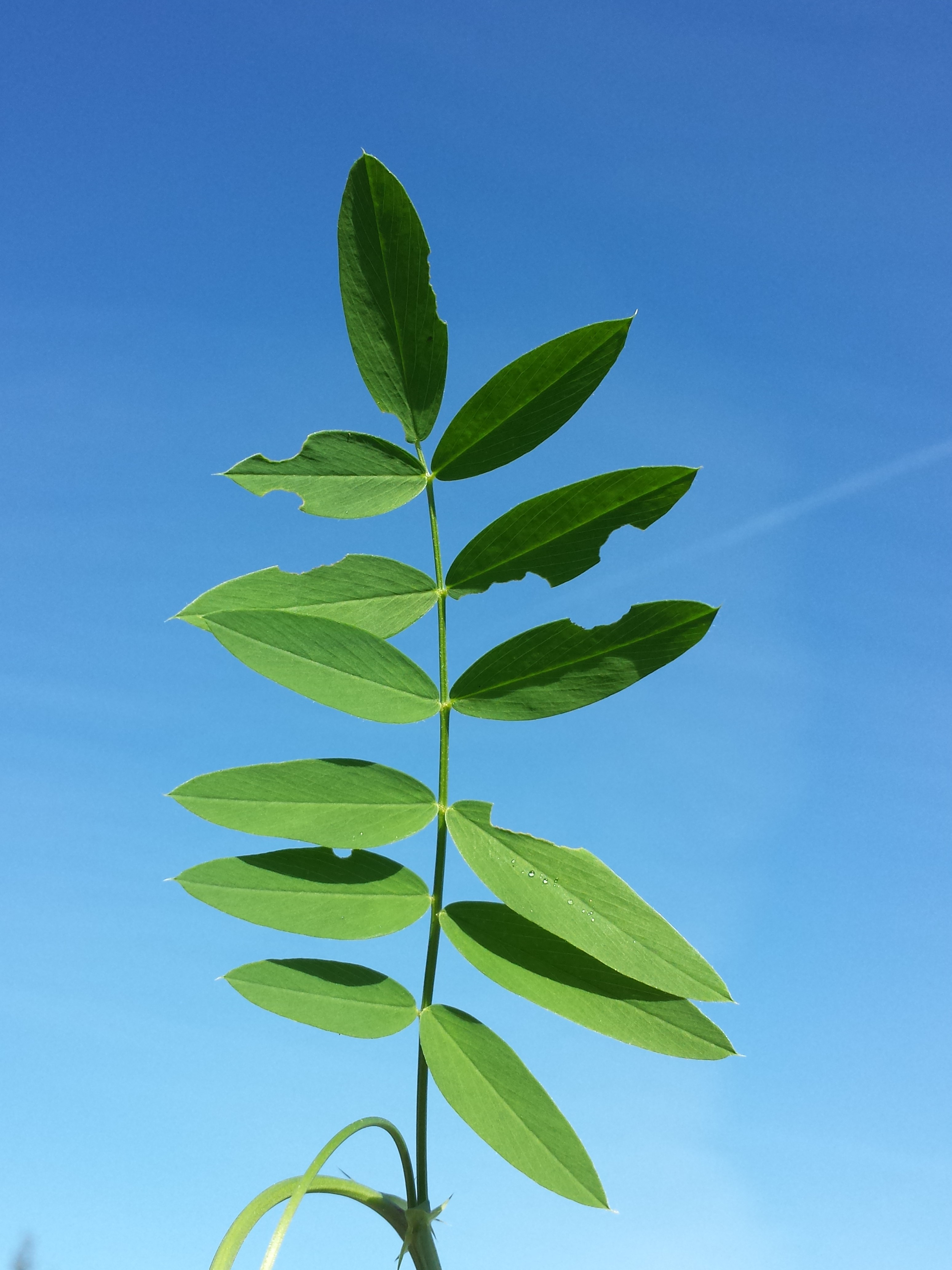
Top side of leaf

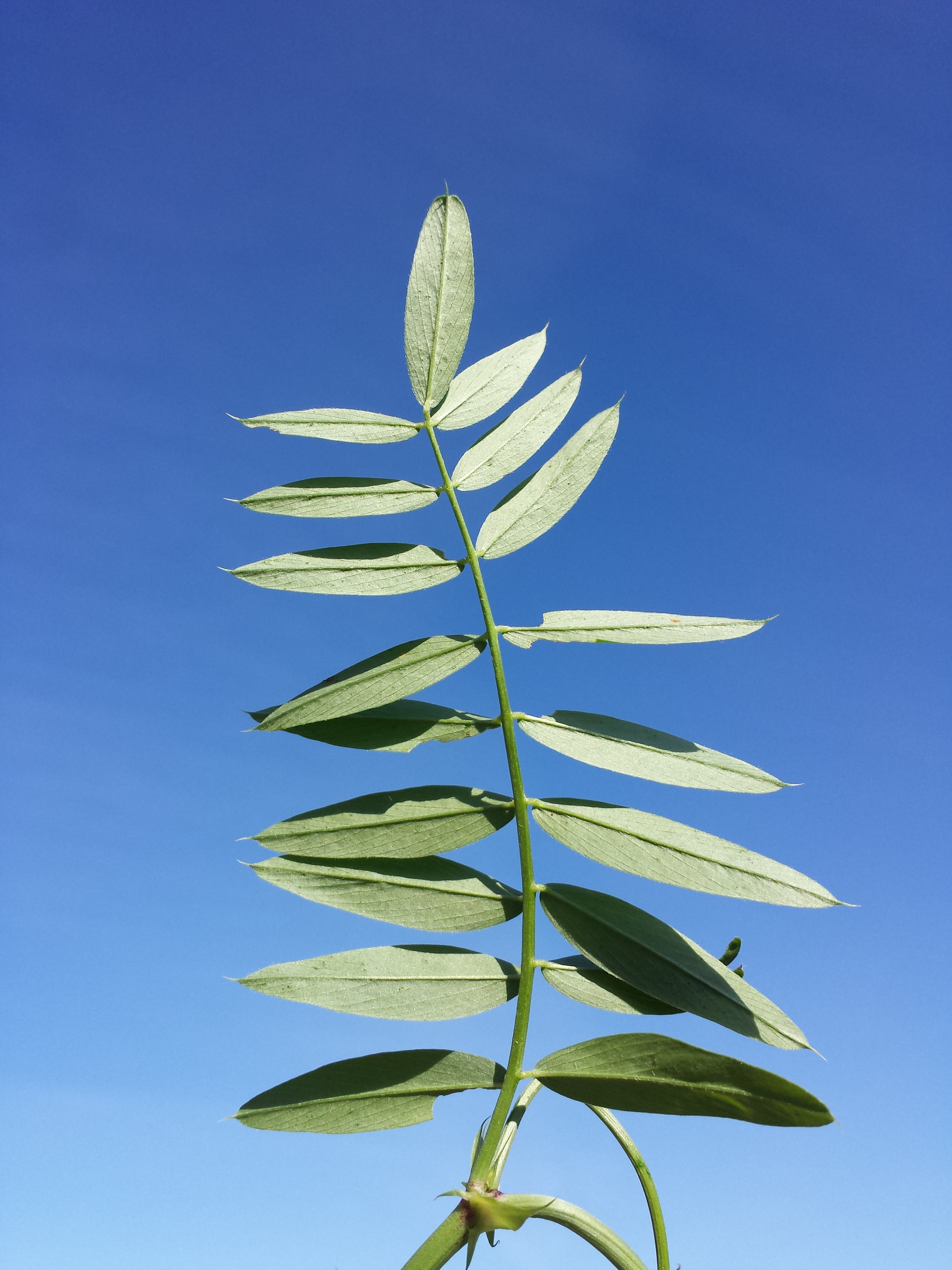
Bottom side of leaf
