= C21H25NO4 =

The molecular formula C_{21}H_{25}NO_{4} (molar mass: 355.42 g/mol, exact mass: 355.1784 u) may refer to:

- Glaucine, an alkaloid
- LY-307,452
- Nalmexone
- Tetrahydropalmatine, an alkaloid
- Yuanhunine
