= C18H21NO2 =

The molecular formulas C_{18}H_{21}NO_{2} (molar mass: 283.36 g/mol) may refer to:

- N,O-Dimethyl-4-(2-naphthyl)piperidine-3-carboxylate
- HDMP-28
- Methyldesorphine
- 6-Methylenedihydrodesoxymorphine
- Naranol
- PRL-8-53
- SCHEMBL5334361
