= C15H22N2O6 =

The molecular formula C_{15}H_{22}N_{2}O_{6} may refer to:

- Lysine acetylsalicylate
- Nipradilol
