= Nitrofuran =

Class of pharmaceutical drugs

Nitrofural (nitrofurazone)

Nifuratel

Nitrofurans are a class of drugs typically used as antibiotics or antimicrobials. The defining structural component is a furan ring with a nitro group.

== Drugs ==
Members of this class of drugs include:

- Antibacterials (antibiotics)
  - Difurazone (also known as Nitrovin) — an antibacterial growth promoter used in animal feeds
  - Furazolidone
  - Nifurfoline
  - Nifuroxazide
  - Nifurquinazol
  - Nifurtoinol
  - Nifurzide
  - Nitrofural (also known as nitrofurazone)
  - Nitrofurantoin — a drug used to treat urinary tract infections
  - Ranbezolid — technically an oxazolidinone antibiotic bearing a nitrofuran group
- Antimicrobials
  - Furaltadone — an antiprotozoal
  - Furazidine — an antibacterial and antiprotozoal
    - Furaginum — an antibacterial
  - Furylfuramide — a formerly used food preservative
  - Nifuratel — an antiprotozoal and antifungal
  - Nifurtimox — an antiprotozoal
- FANFT, a potent nitrofuran derivative tumor initiator. It causes bladder tumors in all animals studied and is mutagenic to many bacteria.

== Regulation ==
The European Union has banned the use of Nitrofurans in food-producing animals. In the 2000s, a number of meat imports were destroyed after nitrofurans were found, including chicken imported from Portugal, and chicken imported from Thailand and Brazil.
