= C12H8N4O6S =

The molecular formula C_{12}H_{8}N_{4}O_{6}S (molar mass: 336.28 g/mol, exact mass: 336.0165 u) may refer to:

- NBQX (2,3-dioxo-6-nitro-7-sulfamoyl-benzo[f]quinoxaline)
- Nifurzide
