= Furazolidone =

Chemical compound

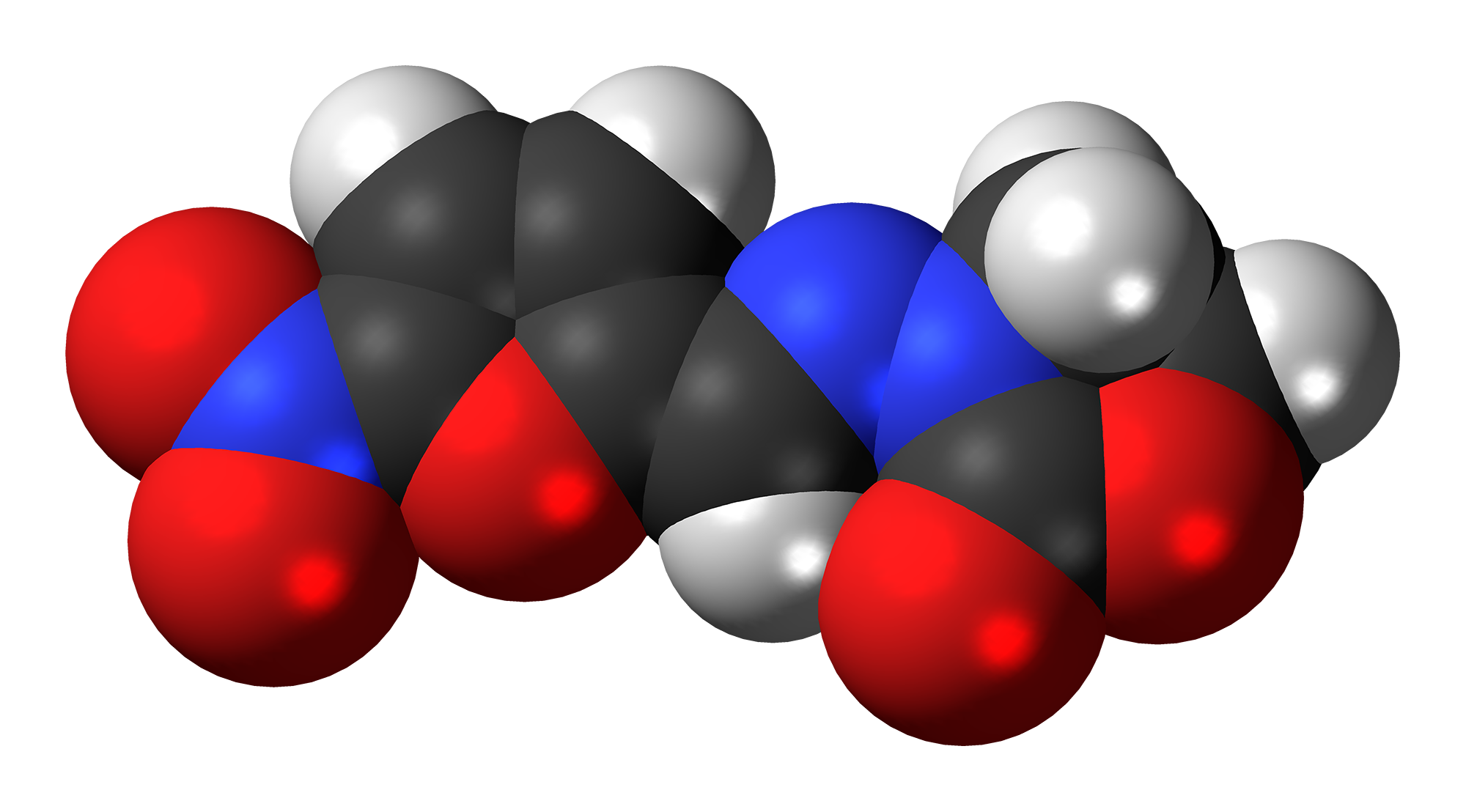

Clinical data
- AHFS/Drugs.com: Micromedex Detailed Consumer Information
- Routes of administration: Oral-Local
- ATC code: G01AX06 (WHO) QJ01XE90 (WHO)

Identifiers
- IUPAC name: 3-[(5-nitrofuran-2-yl)methylideneamino]-1,3-oxazolidin-2-one
- CAS Number: 67-45-8
- PubChem CID: 3435
- DrugBank: DB00614
- ChemSpider: 3317
- UNII: 5J9CPU3RE0
- KEGG: C07999
- ChEMBL: ChEMBL1103
- CompTox Dashboard (EPA): DTXSID4041997
- ECHA InfoCard: 100.000.594

Chemical and physical data
- Formula: C_{8}H_{7}N_{3}O_{5}
- Molar mass: 225.160 g·mol^{−1}
- 3D model (JSmol): Interactive image
- SMILES: C1COC(=O)N1N=CC2=CC=C(O2)[N+](=O)[O-]
- InChI: InChI=1S/C8H7N3O5/c12-8-10(3-4-15-8)9-5-6-1-2-7(16-6)11(13)14/h1-2,5H,3-4H2; Key:PLHJDBGFXBMTGZ-UHFFFAOYSA-N

Furazolidone is a nitrofuran antibacterial agent and monoamine oxidase inhibitor (MAOI). It is marketed by Roberts Laboratories under the brand name Furoxone and by GlaxoSmithKline as Dependal-M.

== Medical uses ==
Furazolidone has been used in human and veterinary medicine. It has a broad spectrum of activity, being active against:

- Gram-positive bacteria
  - Clostridium perfringens
  - Corynebacterium pyogenes
  - Streptococci
  - Staphylococci
- Gram-negative bacteria
  - Escherichia coli
  - Salmonella dublin
  - Salmonella typhimurium
  - Shigella
- Protozoa
  - Giardia lamblia
  - Eimeria species
  - Histomonas meleagridis

=== Use in humans ===
In humans, it has been used to treat diarrhoea and enteritis caused by bacterial or protozoan infections, including traveler's diarrhoea, cholera, and bacteremic salmonellosis.

In 2002, a journal article suggested its use in treatment of H. pylori infections in children.

Furazolidone has also been used for giardiasis (due to Giardia lamblia), amoebiasis, and shigellosis, although it is not a first-line treatment.

From the early 1970s, it has been used in China to treat peptic ulcers, where the mechanism is treatment of the causative Helicobacter pylori infection.

=== Use in animals ===
As a veterinary medicine, furazolidone has been used with some success to treat salmonids for Myxobolus cerebralis infections.

It has also been used in aquaculture.

Since furazolidone is a nitrofuran antibiotic, its use in food animals is currently prohibited by the FDA under the Animal Medicinal Drug Use Clarification Act, 1994.

Furazolidone is no longer available in the US.

=== Use in laboratory ===
It is used to differentiate micrococci and staphylococci.

== Mechanism of action ==
It is believed to work by crosslinking of DNA.

== Side effects ==
Though an effective antibiotic when all others fail, against extremely drug resistant infections, it has many side effects. including inhibition of monoamine oxidase, and as with other nitrofurans generally, minimum inhibitory concentrations also produce systemic toxicity, resulting in tremors, convulsions, peripheral neuritis, gastrointestinal disturbances, and depression of spermatogenesis. Nitrofurans are recognized by FDA as mutagens/carcinogens, and can no longer be used in food-producing animals in the United States as of 1991.

== See also ==
- Nitrofurazone
- Nitrofurantoin
- Norwich Pharmacal Co. & Others v Customs and Excise Commissioners
- Peptic ulcers and Helicobacter pylori
