= PRL =

PRL may refer to:

== Places ==
- Polish People's Republic (Polska Rzeczpospolita Ludowa), 1952–1989

== Business and enterprises ==
- Pakistan Refinery Limited, a refinery in Karachi
- Penn Eastern Rail Lines, reporting mark
- Polo Ralph Lauren, an American clothing and lifestyle brand

== Computing and technology ==
- Preferred Roaming List, in CDMA phones
- The PRL Project at Cornell University which maintains the Nuprl mathematical proofing toolset.
- Proportional reduction in loss, a measure of reliability
- Protocol-relative link, URLs which do not specify a protocol

== Political parties ==
- Liberal Reformist Party (Dominican Republic)
- Parti Réformateur Libéral, a former political party in Belgium
- Party of the Radical Left (Partija radikalne levice), a political party in Serbia
- Republican Party of Liberty, a conservative political party in France, 1945–1951

== Other organisations ==
- Premiership Rugby Limited, the organising body of Premiership Rugby

== Science and healthcare ==
- Physical Research Laboratory, India
- Physical Review Letters, a scientific journal
- PRL-8-53, Nootropic research chemical
- Prolactin, a hormone
- MSU-DOE Plant Research Laboratory in Michigan, United States

== Other ==
- Parramatta Rail Link, a formerly proposed railway project in Sydney, Australia
