= C15H15NO2 =

The molecular formula C_{15}H_{15}NO_{2} (molar mass: 241.285 g/mol, exact mass: 241.1103 u) may refer to:

- Diphenylalanine
- Mefenamic acid
- Nafoxadol
