= Pulmonary toxicity =

Side effects on the lungs

Pulmonary toxicity, or lung toxicity, is the medical name for adverse effects on the lungs. Although most cases of pulmonary toxicity in medicine are due to side effects of medicinal drugs, many cases can be due to side effects of radiation, such as in radiotherapy. Other (non-medical) causes can include chemical compounds and airborne particulate matter.

== Presentation ==
Side effects on the lungs can be very varied, and can include signs and symptoms that are either clinical, or radiological (i.e., seen on chest X-ray or CT), or both. They can include lung inflammation (pneumonitis), secondary (in this context, indirectly caused) lung infection (pneumonia), lung fibrosis, organising pneumonia (bronchiolitis obliterans organising pneumonia, BOOP), ARDS (acute respiratory distress syndrome), solitary pulmonary mass (even including lung cancer in some cases, mainly in cases of asbestos-related lung disease, but today this is very rare, because asbestos is now completely prohibited by law in most countries), or lung nodule. The diagnosis should be made by a specialist, if possible.

== Cause ==
=== Pulmonary toxicity due to medicinal drugs ===
Within all classes of medicinal drugs that possibly can lead to pulmonary toxicity as a side effect, most pulmonary toxicity is due to chemotherapy for cancer.

Many medicinal drugs can lead to pulmonary toxicity. A few medicinal drugs can lead to pulmonary toxicity frequently (in medicine defined by international regulatory authorities such as the U.S. Food and Drug Administration and the EMEA [European Union] as > 1% and < 10%) or very frequently (defined as > 10%). These medicinal drugs can include gold and nitrofurantoin, as well as the following drugs used in chemotherapy for cancer: Methotrexate, the taxanes (paclitaxel and docetaxel), gemcitabine, bleomycin, mitomycin C, busulfan, cyclophosphamide, chlorambucil, and nitrosourea (e.g., carmustine).

Also, some medicinal drugs used in cardiovascular medicine can lead to pulmonary toxicity frequently or very frequently. These include above all amiodarone, as well as beta blockers, ACE inhibitors (however, pulmonary toxicity of ACE inhibitors usually lasts only 3–4 months and then usually disappears by itself), procainamide, quinidine, tocainide, and minoxidil.

Both oncologists and cardiologists are well aware of possible pulmonary toxicity.

=== Pros and cons of medicinal drugs ===
The "medical benefit-cost ratio" for the patient should be kept in mind. Medicinal drugs should not be ruled out completely right from the start just because they possibly could cause pulmonary toxicity. A number of medicinal drugs that could cause pulmonary toxicity can be life-saving for certain patients with specific diseases. For example, amiodarone falls into this category. Ideally, the pros and cons should be weighed at the start of therapy and in regular intervals thereafter, based on the available scientific/medical evidence, by an expert physician, together with an informed patient.

=== Pulmonary toxicity due to radiation (radiotherapy) ===
Radiation (radiotherapy) is frequently used for the treatment of many cancer types, and can be highly effective. Unfortunately, it also can lead to pulmonary toxicity as a side effect.Radiotherapists are well aware of possible pulmonary toxicity, and take a number of precautions to minimise the incidence of this side effect. There are research efforts to possibly eliminate this side effect in the future.

=== Pulmonary toxicity due to chemical compounds ===
Pulmonary toxicity is possible due to many chemical compounds. However, the most famous (infamous) example is pulmonary toxicity due to asbestos. Asbestos can lead to a highly dangerous (i.e., highly malignant) lung cancer called malignant pleural mesothelioma, sometimes also simply called mesothelioma. As a consequence, the use of asbestos is now completely prohibited by law in most countries.

=== Particulate matter leading to pulmonary toxicity ===
Atmospheric particulate matter is part of air pollution. Particulate matter is produced mainly by car traffic, overland traffic (trucks), industrial production facilities, and cigarette smoking. More and more data were gathered in recent years. The data showed that particulate matter can be a major cause of cardiovascular disease, and can also cause pulmonary toxicity. As a consequence, laws, by-laws and guidelines that regulate the amount of particulate matter that can be emitted in a given time period were issued in the European Union.

== Diagnosis ==
Lung symptoms in a patient who is taking a medicinal drug that can cause pulmonary toxicity should not automatically lead to a diagnosis of "pulmonary toxicity due to the medicinal drug", because some patients can have another (i.e., simultaneous) lung disease, e.g. an infection of the lungs not related to the medicinal drugs the patient is taking. But if the patient is taking such a medicinal drug, this should not be overlooked. Diagnostic care should be executed. The correct diagnosis is an exclusion diagnosis and can require some tests.

== Treatment ==
The treatment of pulmonary toxicity due to medicinal drugs is to discontinue (= to stop taking) the medicinal drug in question. A dose reduction (instead of discontinuation) can be attempted in selected cases only, only under the guidance of an expert physician. Discontinuation (or, if possible, dose reduction under the guidance of an expert physician) should be done in all cases. This approach has been published for many individual medicinal drugs, but it is principally valid for all cases pulmonary toxicity due to medicinal drugs.

As an example to illustrate what can be done, the use of the medicinal drug amiodarone: a) Prescribing the lowest possible dose of amiodarone leads to a lower incidence of pulmonary toxicity. b) Regular monitoring, in order to diagnose any possible pulmonary toxicity early. c) Discontinuation as soon as pulmonary toxicity is detected.

One publication summarises the most important points about amiodarone-induced pulmonary toxicity (AIPT) as follows: "The most serious adverse reaction of amiodarone is pulmonary toxicity (AIPT). AIPT may manifest as chronic interstitial pneumonitis, organising pneumonia, acute respiratory distress syndrome, pulmonary mass, or nodules. On radiological imaging, pulmonary infiltrates induced by amiodarone are usually high in attenuation. On biopsy, the presence of foamy macrophages confirms exposure to amiodarone but not necessarily proves that amiodarone is the responsible cause. Most patients with AIPT respond well to the withdrawal of amiodarone and to the addition of corticosteroid treatment, which is usually given for two to six months."
