= Furylfuramide =

Names
- Preferred IUPAC name (2Z)-2-(Furan-2-yl)-3-(5-nitrofuran-2-yl)prop-2-enamide
- Other names (Z)-2-(2-Furyl)-3-(5-nitro-2-furyl)prop-2-enamide; AF-2, Tofuron, Alpha-2-furyl-5-nitro-2-furanacrylamide, 2-(2-Furyl)-3-(5-nitro-2-furyl)acrylic acid amide, a-(Furyl)-b-(5-nitro-2-furyl)acrylic amide, trans-2-(2-Furyl)-3-(5-nitro-2-furyl)acrylamide, 2-(2-furyl)-3-(5-nitro-2-furyl) acrylamide, 2-Furanacetamide, alpha-((5-nitro-2-furanyl)methylene)-,

Identifiers
CAS Number	3688-53-7
3D model (JSmol)	Interactive image
Abbreviations	AF-2, FF
ChEBI	CHEBI:15660
ChEMBL	ChEMBL259747
ChemSpider	4444292
KEGG	D02528
PubChem CID	5280707
UNII	054NR2135Y
- InChI: InChI=1S/C11H8N2O5/c12-11(14)8(9-2-1-5-17-9)6-7-3-4-10(18-7)13(15)16/h1-6H,(H2,12,14)/b8-6- Key: LYAHJFZLDZDIOH-VURMDHGXSA-N; InChI=1/C11H8N2O5/c12-11(14)8(9-2-1-5-17-9)6-7-3-4-10(18-7)13(15)16/h1-6H,(H2,12,14)/b8-6- Key: LYAHJFZLDZDIOH-VURMDHGXBB
- SMILES: O=[N+]([O-])c2oc(/C=C(/c1occc1)C(=O)N)cc2

Properties
Chemical formula	C_{11}H_{8}N_{2}O_{5}
Molar mass	248.19162
- Except where otherwise noted, data are given for materials in their standard state (at 25 °C [77 °F], 100 kPa). verify (what is ?) Infobox references

Furylfuramide (also known as AF-2) is a synthetic nitrofuran derivative which was widely used as a food preservative in Japan since at least 1965, but withdrawn from the market in 1974 when it was observed to be mutagenic to bacteria in vitro and thus suspected of carcinogenicity. This was confirmed later when animal testing found it to cause benign and malignant tumors in the mammary glands, stomachs, esophagi, and lungs of rodents of both sexes, although insufficient evidence exists in human exposure.

This successful use of bacterial mutagenicity as a screen for carcinogenicity confirmed the use of this methodology as a rapid and efficient test, in comparison to animal testing alone, and led to its further development. The availability of such simpler tests in turn gave rise to greater government oversight and testing of compounds to which the public would be exposed.
