= Mechanism of action =

Biochemical interaction through which a drug produces its pharmacological effect

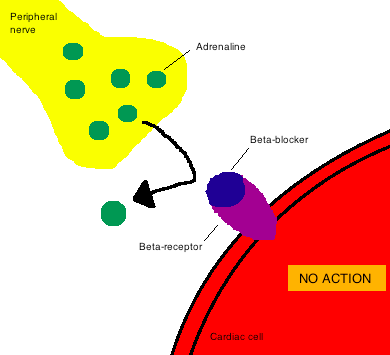
Beta blockers exert their pharmacological effect, decreased heart rate, by binding to and competitively antagonising a type of receptor called beta adrenoceptors.

In pharmacology, the term mechanism of action (MOA) refers to the specific biochemical interaction through which a drug substance produces its pharmacological effect. A mechanism of action usually includes mention of the specific molecular targets to which the drug binds, such as an enzyme or receptor. Receptor sites have specific affinities for drugs based on the chemical structure of the drug, as well as the specific action that occurs there.

Drugs that do not bind to receptors produce their corresponding therapeutic effect by simply interacting with chemical or physical properties in the body. Common examples of drugs that work in this way are antacids and laxatives.

In contrast, a mode of action (MoA) describes functional or anatomical changes, at the cellular level, resulting from the exposure of a living organism to a substance.

== Importance ==
Elucidating the mechanism of action of novel drugs and medications is important for several reasons:

- In the case of anti-infective drug development, the information permits anticipation of problems relating to clinical safety. Drugs disrupting the cytoplasmic membrane or electron transport chain, for example, are more likely to cause toxicity problems than those targeting components of the cell wall (peptidoglycan or β-glucans) or 70S ribosome, structures which are absent in human cells.
- By knowing the interaction between a certain site of a drug and a receptor, other drugs can be formulated in a way that replicates this interaction, thus producing the same therapeutic effects. Indeed, this method is used to create new drugs.
- It can help identify which patients are most likely to respond to treatment. Because the breast cancer medication trastuzumab is known to target protein HER2, for example, tumors can be screened for the presence of this molecule to determine whether or not the patient will benefit from trastuzumab therapy.
- It can enable better dosing because the drug's effects on the target pathway can be monitored in the patient. Statin dosage, for example, is usually determined by measuring the patient's blood cholesterol levels.
- It allows drugs to be combined in such a way that the likelihood of drug resistance emerging is reduced. By knowing what cellular structure an anti-infective or anticancer drug acts upon, it is possible to administer a cocktail that inhibits multiple targets simultaneously, thereby reducing the risk that a single mutation in microbial or tumor DNA will lead to drug resistance and treatment failure.
- It may allow other indications for the drug to be identified. Discovery that sildenafil inhibits phosphodiesterase-5 (PDE-5) proteins, for example, enabled this drug to be repurposed for pulmonary arterial hypertension treatment, since PDE-5 is expressed in pulmonary hypertensive lungs.

== Determination ==
=== Microscopy-based methods ===
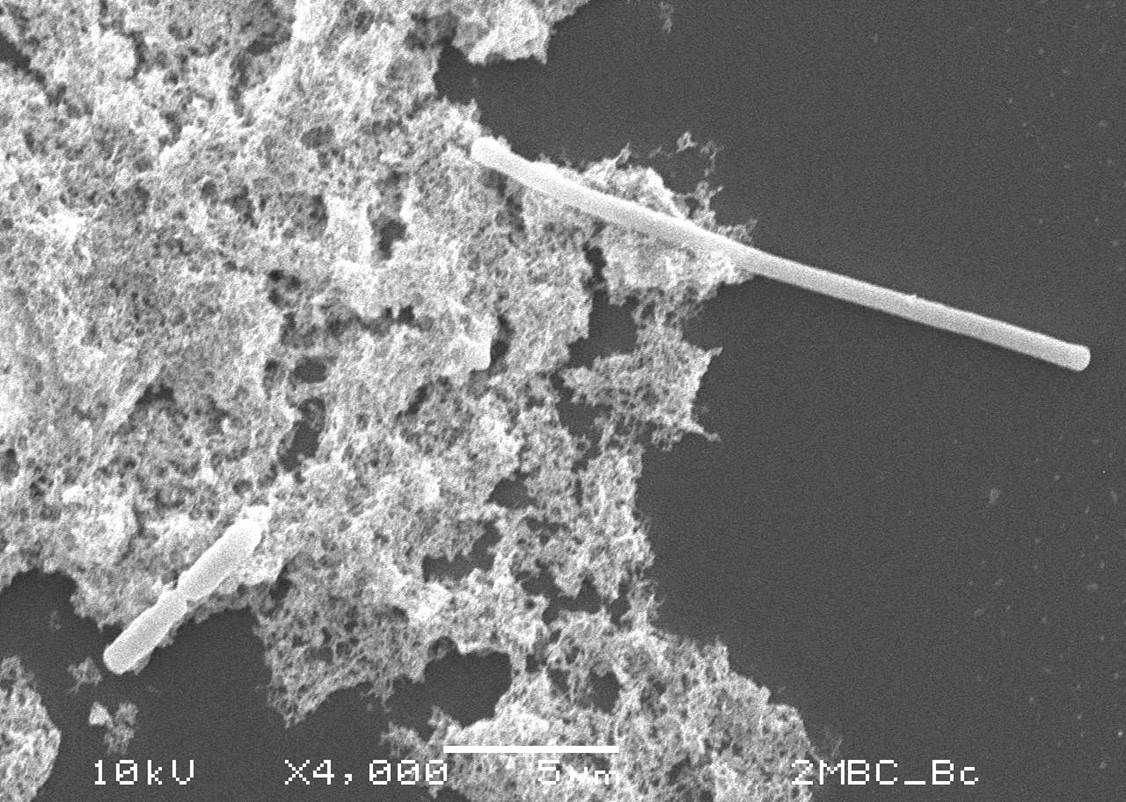
Filamentation (top right) can indicate that an antibacterial agent is targeting PBP3, FtsZ or DNA.

Bioactive compounds induce phenotypic changes in target cells, changes that are observable by microscopy and that can give insight into the mechanism of action of the compound.

With antibacterial agents, the conversion of target cells to spheroplasts can be an indication that peptidoglycan synthesis is being inhibited, and filamentation of target cells can be an indication that PBP3, FtsZ, or DNA synthesis is being inhibited. Other antibacterial agent-induced changes include ovoid cell formation, pseudomulticellular forms, localized swelling, bulge formation, blebbing, and peptidoglycan thickening. In the case of anticancer agents, bleb formation can be an indication that the compound is disrupting the plasma membrane.

A current limitation of this approach is the time required to manually generate and interpret data, but advances in automated microscopy and image analysis software may help resolve this.

=== Direct biochemical methods ===
Direct biochemical methods include methods in which a protein or a small molecule, such as a drug candidate, is labeled and is traced throughout the body. This proves to be the most direct approach to find target protein that will bind to small targets of interest, such as a basic representation of a drug outline, in order to identify the pharmacophore of the drug. Due to the physical interactions between the labeled molecule and a protein, biochemical methods can be used to determine the toxicity, efficacy, and mechanism of action of the drug.

=== Computation inference methods ===
Typically, computation inference methods are primarily used to predict protein targets for small molecule drugs based on computer based pattern recognition. However, this method could also be used for finding new targets for existing or newly developed drugs. By identifying the pharmacophore of the drug molecule, the profiling method of pattern recognition can be carried out where a new target is identified. This provides an insight at a possible mechanism of action since it is known what certain functional components of the drug are responsible for when interacting with a certain area on a protein, thus leading to a therapeutic effect.

=== Omics based methods ===
Omics based methods use omics technologies, such as chemoproteomics, reverse genetics and genomics, transcriptomics, and proteomics, to identify the potential targets of the compound of interest. Reverse genetics and genomics approaches, for instance, uses genetic perturbation (e.g. CRISPR-Cas9 or siRNA) in combination with the compound to identify genes whose knockdown or knockout abolishes the pharmacological effect of the compound. On the other hand, transcriptomics and proteomics profiles of the compound can be used to compare with profiles of compounds with known targets. Thanks to computation inference, it is then possible to make hypotheses about the mechanism of action of the compound, which can subsequently be tested.

== Drugs with known MOA ==
There are many drugs in which the mechanism of action is known. One example is aspirin.

=== Aspirin ===
The mechanism of action of aspirin involves irreversible inhibition of the enzyme cyclooxygenase; therefore suppressing the production of prostaglandins and thromboxanes, thus reducing pain and inflammation. This mechanism of action is specific to aspirin and is not constant for all nonsteroidal anti-inflammatory drugs (NSAIDs). Rather, aspirin is the only NSAID that irreversibly inhibits COX-1.

== Drugs with unknown MOA ==
Some drug mechanisms of action are still unknown. However, even though the mechanism of action of a certain drug is unknown, the drug still functions; it is just unknown or unclear how the drug interacts with receptors and produces its therapeutic effect.

- Acamprosate
- Antidepressants
- Armodafinil
- Cannabidiol
- Cyclobenzaprine
- Demeclocycline
- Fabomotizole
- Lithium
- Meprobamate
- Methocarbamol
- Paracetamol
- Phenytoin
- PRL-8-53
- Metformin
- Thalidomide

== Mode of action ==
In some literature articles, the terms "mechanism of action" and "mode of action" are used interchangeably, typically referring to the way in which the drug interacts and produces a medical effect. However, in actuality, a mode of action describes functional or anatomical changes, at the cellular level, resulting from the exposure of a living organism to a substance. This differs from a mechanism of action since it is a more specific term that focuses on the interaction between the drug itself and an enzyme or receptor and its particular form of interaction, whether through inhibition, activation, agonism, or antagonism. Furthermore, the term "mechanism of action" is the main term that is primarily used in pharmacology, whereas "mode of action" will more often appear in the field of microbiology or certain aspects of biology.

== See also ==
- Mode of action (MoA)
- Pharmacodynamics
- Chemoproteomics
