= Narsoplimab =

Medication

Monoclonal antibody
- Type: Whole antibody
- Source: Human
- Target: Mannan-binding lectin-associated serine protease-2 (MASP2)

Clinical data
- Trade names: Yartemlea
- Other names: OMS-721, OMS620646, narsoplimab-wuug
- AHFS/Drugs.com: Monograph
- MedlinePlus: a626025
- License data: US DailyMed: Narsoplimab
- Routes of administration: Intravenous
- Drug class: Anti-inflammatory
- ATC code: None

Legal status
- Legal status: US: ℞-only

Identifiers
- CAS Number: 2108782-45-0
- DrugBank: DB16418
- UNII: FT24ZQQ5RP
- KEGG: D11531

Chemical and physical data
- Formula: C_{6340}H_{9876}N_{1680}O_{1996}S_{48}
- Molar mass: 143109.39 g·mol^{−1}

Narsoplimab, sold under the brand name Yartemlea, is a monoclonal antibody used for the treatment of hematopoietic stem cell transplant-associated thrombotic microangiopathy. Narsoplimab is a mannan-binding lectin-associated serine protease-2 (MASP-2) inhibitor. It is a recombinant human immunoglobulin G4 (IgG4) monoclonal antibody.

Narsoplimab was approved for medical use in the United States in December 2025. The US Food and Drug Administration considers it to be a first-in-class medication.

== Medical uses ==
Narsoplimab is indicated for the treatment of people with hematopoietic stem cell transplant-associated thrombotic microangiopathy.

Hematopoietic stem cell transplant-associated thrombotic microangiopathy is a serious and life-threatening complication of hematopoietic stem cell transplant in which tiny blood clots form in the small blood vessels. This can lead to organ damage, including damage to the kidneys, cardiovascular system, and gastrointestinal tract.

== Side effects ==
The most common side effects are viral infections, sepsis, hemorrhage, diarrhea, vomiting, nausea, neutropenia (low number of neutrophils, a type of white blood cell), fever, fatigue, and low potassium.

== Mechanism of action ==
Thrombotic microangiopathy is triggered by immunosuppressive treatment during stem cell transplant, especially when calcineurin and mTOR inhibitors are used. It causes injury to endothelial cells, which is associated with an alteration of carbohydrate patterns on these cells, which is recognized by the complement system in the lectin pathway. Lectins are proteins that recognize specific glycoproteins, which is the main cause of microangiopathy during and after this procedure. Mannan-binding lectin-associated serine protease-2 (MASP-2) directly induces the coagulation cascade and the activation of C4 and C2 components. However, it can also bypass their activation by directly activating the C3 component, causing further activation of the terminal pathway and opsonization.

Narsoplimab blocks the action of MASP-2.

== History ==
The efficacy of narsoplimab was assessed in a single-arm, open-label study (TA-TMA Study) of 28 participants, with additional data from 19 participants (6 pediatric participants and 13 adult participants) enrolled in an expanded access program. In the TA-TMA Study, participants either received narsoplimab 4 mg/kg or 370 mg intravenously once weekly.

== Society and culture ==
=== Legal status ===
The European Medicines Agency has recommended the refusal of the marketing authorization for Yartemlea, a medicine intended for the treatment of people from two years of age with hematopoietic stem cell transplant-associated thrombotic microangiopathy. The company for Yartemlea has requested a re-examination of EMA's opinion. Upon receipt of the grounds of this request, the Agency will re-examine its opinion and issue a final recommendation.

== Names ==
Narsoplimab is the international nonproprietary name.

Narsoplimab is sold under the brand name Yartemlea.
