= Niludipine =

Names
- Preferred IUPAC name Bis(2-propoxyethyl) 2,6-dimethyl-4-(3-nitrophenyl)-1,4-dihydropyridine-3,5-dicarboxylate
- Other names 2,6-Dimethyl-4-(3-nitrophenyl)-1,4-dihydropyridine-3,5-dicarboxylic acid bis(2-propoxyethyl) ester

Identifiers
CAS Number	22609-73-0
3D model (JSmol)	Interactive image
ChemSpider	81025
ECHA InfoCard	100.041.003
EC Number	245-120-6
MeSH	C019497
PubChem CID	89767
UNII	9844OS3B0J
CompTox Dashboard (EPA)	DTXSID20945267
- InChI: InChI=1S/C25H34N2O8/c1-5-10-32-12-14-34-24(28)21-17(3)26-18(4)22(25(29)35-15-13-33-11-6-2)23(21)19-8-7-9-20(16-19)27(30)31/h7-9,16,23,26H,5-6,10-15H2,1-4H3 Key: VZWXXKDFACOXNT-UHFFFAOYSA-N; InChI=1/C25H34N2O8/c1-5-10-32-12-14-34-24(28)21-17(3)26-18(4)22(25(29)35-15-13-33-11-6-2)23(21)19-8-7-9-20(16-19)27(30)31/h7-9,16,23,26H,5-6,10-15H2,1-4H3 Key: VZWXXKDFACOXNT-UHFFFAOYAS
- SMILES: CCCOCCOC(=O)C1=C(NC(=C(C1C2=CC(=CC=C2)[N+](=O)[O-])C(=O)OCCOCCC)C)C

Properties
Chemical formula	C_{25}H_{34}N_{2}O_{8}
Molar mass	490.553 g·mol^{−1}
- Except where otherwise noted, data are given for materials in their standard state (at 25 °C [77 °F], 100 kPa). verify (what is ?) Infobox references

Niludipine is a calcium channel blocker of the dihydropyridine class. It is a vasodilator that acts upon the coronary arteries of the heart-lung. It was found to produce a calcium antagonistic effect on the smooth muscle of hearts of canines and guinea pigs inhibiting myocardial oxidative metabolism.
