= Nerelimomab =

Monoclonal antibody

Monoclonal antibody
- Type: Whole antibody
- Source: Mouse
- Target: TNF alpha

Clinical data
- ATC code: none

Identifiers
- CAS Number: 162774-06-3
- ChemSpider: none
- UNII: 1911H0X9KJ
- KEGG: D05146

Nerelimomab is a mouse monoclonal antibody acting as a TNF inhibitor.
