= Nifurquinazol =

Chemical compound

Clinical data
- Routes of administration: ?
- ATC code: none

Legal status
- Legal status: In general: uncontrolled

Identifiers
- IUPAC name: 2,2'-{[2-(5-nitrofuran-2-yl)quinazolin-4-yl]imino}diethanol
- CAS Number: 5055-20-9
- PubChem CID: 21139
- ChemSpider: 19878
- UNII: 44E5RRL600
- KEGG: D05164
- CompTox Dashboard (EPA): DTXSID50198582

Chemical and physical data
- Formula: C_{16}H_{16}N_{4}O_{5}
- Molar mass: 344.327 g·mol^{−1}
- 3D model (JSmol): Interactive image
- SMILES: O=[N+]([O-])c3oc(c1nc(N(CCO)CCO)c2c(n1)cccc2)cc3

Nifurquinazol (NF-1088) is an antibacterial agent of the nitrofuran class. It was never marketed.

== Synthesis ==
Nifurquinazol synthesis:

Treatment of the amide from 5-nitrofuroic acid with phosphorus oxychloride leads to the corresponding nitrile (2). This intermediate is then converted to the iminoether (3) with ethanolic hydrogen chloride. Condensation of anthranilic acid with the iminoether in the presence of sodium methoxide represents another method for preparing quinazolones. The reaction can be visualized as proceeding through the formation of the amidine from addition-elimination of anthranilic acid; cyclization then affords the observed product (4). The amide function is then converted to the iminochloride with phosphorus oxychloride. Displacement of the newly introduced halogen by means of diethanolamine affords nifurquinazol chlorine with diethanolamine leads to the formation of nifurquinazol (5), one of the antibacterial nitrofurans.
