= Nifurtoinol =

Chemical compound

Clinical data
- AHFS/Drugs.com: International Drug Names
- Routes of administration: Oral
- ATC code: J01XE02 (WHO)

Pharmacokinetic data
- Excretion: Renal (40–50% within the first 12 hours)

Identifiers
- IUPAC name: 3-(hydroxymethyl)-1-{[(1E)-(5-nitro-2-furyl) methylene]amino}imidazolidine-2,4-dione
- CAS Number: 1088-92-2
- PubChem CID: 9571062
- ChemSpider: 7845528
- UNII: 980688H13O
- KEGG: D07243
- ChEBI: CHEBI:88255
- CompTox Dashboard (EPA): DTXSID30148747
- ECHA InfoCard: 100.012.842

Chemical and physical data
- Formula: C_{9}H_{8}N_{4}O_{6}
- Molar mass: 268.185 g·mol^{−1}
- 3D model (JSmol): Interactive image
- SMILES: C1C(=O)N(C(=O)N1/N=C/C2=CC=C(O2)[N+](=O)[O-])CO
- InChI: InChI=1S/C9H8N4O6/c14-5-11-7(15)4-12(9(11)16)10-3-6-1-2-8(19-6)13(17)18/h1-3,14H,4-5H2/b10-3+; Key:UIDWQGRXEVDFCA-XCVCLJGOSA-N

Nifurtoinol (rINN, trade name Urfadyn) is a nitrofuran-derivative antibiotic used in the treatment of urinary tract infections.

It is also known as "hydroxymethylnitrofurantoin".
