= LY-307,452 =

Chemical compound

Identifiers
- IUPAC name: (2S,4S)-2-amino-4-(4,4-diphenylbut-1-yl)pentan-1,5-dioic acid
- CAS Number: 174393-13-6
- PubChem CID: 6324634
- IUPHAR/BPS: 3350
- ChemSpider: 4884363
- UNII: ZU8PFA9K8G
- CompTox Dashboard (EPA): DTXSID401028586

Chemical and physical data
- Formula: C_{21}H_{25}NO_{4}
- Molar mass: 355.434 g·mol^{−1}
- 3D model (JSmol): Interactive image
- SMILES: C1=CC=C(C=C1)C(CCC[C@@H](C[C@@H](C(=O)O)N)C(=O)O)C2=CC=CC=C2
- InChI: InChI=1S/C21H25NO4/c22-19(21(25)26)14-17(20(23)24)12-7-13-18(15-8-3-1-4-9-15)16-10-5-2-6-11-16/h1-6,8-11,17-19H,7,12-14,22H2,(H,23,24)(H,25,26)/t17-,19-/m0/s1; Key:DWLOVDOPFJPWNE-HKUYNNGSSA-N

LY-307,452 is a drug used in neuroscience research, which was among the first compounds found that acts as a selective antagonist for the group II metabotropic glutamate receptors (mGluR_{2/3}), and was useful in early studies of this receptor family, although it has largely been replaced by newer drugs such as LY-341,495. Its molecular formula is C_{21}H_{25}NO_{4}
