= Nacolomab tafenatox =

- Schematic image of nacolomab tafenatox: V_{H}, V_{L}: variable (antigen binding) domains of antibody fragment C_{H}1, C_{L}: constant domains of antibody fragment SAg: enterotoxin A (acting as a superantigen)

Monoclonal antibody
- Type: Fab fragment
- Source: Mouse
- Target: colorectal tumor antigen C242

Clinical data
- ATC code: none

Identifiers
- CAS Number: 150631-27-9
- ChemSpider: none
- UNII: PRC47TA1NU

Nacolomab tafenatox is a mouse monoclonal antibody. The antibody itself, nacolomab, is fused with enterotoxin A from Staphylococcus aureus (which is reflected by 'tafenatox' in the drug's name).

== See also ==
- Naptumomab estafenatox, a drug with a similar chemical structure and mechanism
