= Furaltadone =

Identifiers
CAS Number	139-91-3
3D model (JSmol)	Interactive image
ChEBI	CHEBI:74803
ChEMBL	ChEMBL1189513
ChemSpider	7831887
DrugBank	DB16567
ECHA InfoCard	100.004.895
EC Number	205-384-5
KEGG	D02510
PubChem CID	9553856
UNII	5X4V82ZN30
CompTox Dashboard (EPA)	DTXSID4048016
- InChI: InChI=1S/C13H16N4O6/c18-13-16(14-7-10-1-2-12(22-10)17(19)20)9-11(23-13)8-15-3-5-21-6-4-15/h1-2,7,11H,3-6,8-9H2/b14-7+ Key: YVQVOQKFMFRVGR-VGOFMYFVSA-N
- SMILES: C1COCCN1CC2CN(C(=O)O2)/N=C/C3=CC=C(O3)[N+](=O)[O-]

Properties
Chemical formula	C_{13}H_{16}N_{4}O_{6}
Molar mass	324.29 g·mol^{−1}
Appearance	yellow solid

Hazards
- GHS labelling
Pictograms	(GHS07: Exclamation mark)
Signal word	Warning
Hazard statements	H302
Precautionary statements	P264, P270, P301+P317, P330, P501
- Except where otherwise noted, data are given for materials in their standard state (at 25 °C [77 °F], 100 kPa). Infobox references

Furaltadone is a chemical compound from the group of nitrofurans, as it contains a 5-nitrofuran ring. Furaltadone is classified as a synthetic antibiotic. It was patented in 1957.

== Properties ==
Furaltadone has a chiral carbon atom and exists as a racemate. The (S)-form is known as levofuraltadone.

Furaltadone, (R) form

Levofuraltadone, (S) form

== Use ==
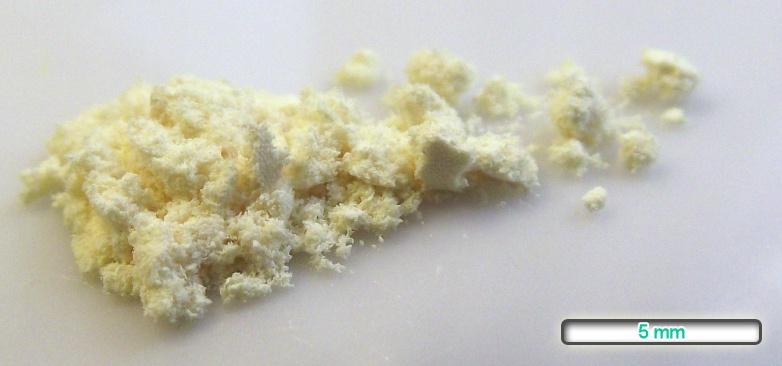
furaltadone hydrochloride

Furaltadone was particularly used for the treatment of poultry. Residues of this active substance are classified as hazardous at any concentration due to their potential carcinogenic and mutagenic effects.

Furaltadone is used in human medicine as an antibiotic for urinary tract infections. It is also utilized as an antiprotozoal. It was first introduced in October 1958 by Kefauver, Paberzs, and McNamara under the active ingredient name "Furmethonol" as a potentially effective agent for the peroral treatment of systemic bacterial infections. It was introduced to the US market in 1959 under the trade name Altafur (Eaton Laboratories).

== Regulation ==
In the European Union, the use of furaltadone in food-producing animals has been banned since 1993. Consequently, no preparation based on this active substance is marketable.

Under The Safe Drinking Water and Toxic Enforcement Act of 1986, California has required labeling for products containing furaltadone since April 1, 1988.
