= Yuanhunine =

Names
- IUPAC name 2,3,9-Trimethoxy-13α-methyl-13aβ-berbin-10-ol
- Systematic IUPAC name (13S,13aR)-2,3,9-Trimethoxy-13-methyl-5,8,13,13a-tetrahydro-6H-isoquinolino[3,2-a]isoquinolin-10-ol

Identifiers
CAS Number	104387-15-7
3D model (JSmol)	Interactive image
ChemSpider	113944
MeSH	C051427
PubChem CID	128558
UNII	E2JUV4TX4M
CompTox Dashboard (EPA)	DTXSID10146443
- InChI: InChI=1S/C21H25NO4/c1-12-14-5-6-17(23)21(26-4)16(14)11-22-8-7-13-9-18(24-2)19(25-3)10-15(13)20(12)22/h5-6,9-10,12,20,23H,7-8,11H2,1-4H3/t12-,20+/m0/s1 Key: PVYYNJAXBCIMNG-FKIZINRSSA-N; InChI=1/C21H25NO4/c1-12-14-5-6-17(23)21(26-4)16(14)11-22-8-7-13-9-18(24-2)19(25-3)10-15(13)20(12)22/h5-6,9-10,12,20,23H,7-8,11H2,1-4H3/t12-,20+/m0/s1 Key: PVYYNJAXBCIMNG-FKIZINRSBB
- SMILES: O(c1c4c(ccc1O)[C@@H]([C@@H]3c2c(cc(OC)c(OC)c2)CCN3C4)C)C

Properties
Chemical formula	C_{21}H_{25}NO_{4}
Molar mass	355.434 g·mol^{−1}
Solubility	Soluble in DMSO
- Except where otherwise noted, data are given for materials in their standard state (at 25 °C [77 °F], 100 kPa). Infobox references

Yuanhunine is an anti-allergic alkaloid isolated from Corydalis.
