= Nifuroxazide =

Chemical compound

Clinical data
- AHFS/Drugs.com: International Drug Names
- Routes of administration: Oral
- ATC code: A07AX03 (WHO)

Identifiers
- IUPAC name: 4-hydroxy-N-[(E)-(5-nitrofuran-2-yl)methylideneamino]benzamide
- CAS Number: 965-52-6
- PubChem CID: 5337997
- DrugBank: DB13855
- ChemSpider: 4495115
- UNII: PM5LI0P38J
- KEGG: D07111
- ChEMBL: ChEMBL244888
- CompTox Dashboard (EPA): DTXSID4045343
- ECHA InfoCard: 100.012.293

Chemical and physical data
- Formula: C_{12}H_{9}N_{3}O_{5}
- Molar mass: 275.220 g·mol^{−1}
- 3D model (JSmol): Interactive image
- SMILES: c1cc(O)ccc1C(=O)N/N=C/c2ccc(o2)[N+](=O)[O-]
- InChI: InChI=1S/C12H9N3O5/c16-9-3-1-8(2-4-9)12(17)14-13-7-10-5-6-11(20-10)15(18)19/h1-7,16H,(H,14,17)/b13-7+; Key:YCWSUKQGVSGXJO-NTUHNPAUSA-N

Nifuroxazide (INN) is an oral nitrofuran antibiotic, patented since 1966 and used to treat colitis and diarrhea in humans and non-humans. It is sold under the brand names Ambatrol, Antinal, Bacifurane, Diafuryl (Turkey), Benol (Pakistan), Pérabacticel (France), Diax (Egypt), Dearexin (Guatemala), Nifrozid, Ercefuryl (Romania, Czech Republic, Russia), Erfuzide (Thailand), Endiex (Slovakia), Enterofuryl (Bosnia and Herzegovina, Montenegro, North Macedonia, Russia), Pentofuryl (Germany), Nifuroksazyd Hasco, Nifuroksazyd Polpharma (Poland), Topron, Enterovid (Latin America), Eskapar (Mexico), Enterocolin, Terracolin (Bolivia), Apazid (Morocco), Nifroxid (Tunisia), Hufafural, Nifural (Indonesia), Nitronal (Georgia) and Septidiaryl. It is sold in capsule form and also as a suspension.

== Medical uses ==
Nifuroxazide have been found effective in infective diarrhea.

== Mechanism of action ==
Nifuroxazide is a nitrofuran antibacterial used for acute infectious diarrhea and related gastrointestinal infections; it is designed to act locally in the gut rather than systemically. Systemic absorption is negligible at therapeutic doses. Action of the drug is confined to the intestinal lumen, making it suitable for diarrheal infections where a local effect is desired.

The nitro group of nifuroxazide is reduced by bacterial nitroreductases, generating reactive species that disrupt essential bacterial enzymes and macromolecules, so that the net effect is bactericidal activity localized to the gut lumen.

== History ==
Maurice Claude Ernest Carron patented the drug in the United States in 1966. Subsequent patents issued to Germano Cagliero of Marxer S.p.A. describe the use of nifuroxazide as an antibiotic used to treat livestock.

== Health claims ==
In 1997, in an Ivory Coast promotional leaflet, GlaxoSmithKline claimed that nifuroxazide (under the brand name "Ambatrol") is an anti-dehydration treatment, "neutralise[s] microbacterials" in diarrhoea, and has "a spectrum which covers most enteropathogenic microbacterials, Shigella, Escherichia coli, Salmonella, Staphylococci, Klebsiella, Yersinia". The international non-profit organization Healthy Skepticism, at the time using their former name, Medical Lobby for Appropriate Marketing (MaLAM), disagreed, stating "We have not found any scientific evidence to support these claims."

== Research directions ==
=== STAT3 inhibition ===
In addition to its antibiotic activity, nifuroxazide has been predicted to possess properties of inhibiting STAT3, so it can potentially interfere with a specific cell signaling pathway that some cancer cells depend on for survival, proliferation, and metastasis.

=== ALDH1 cancer stem cells ===
Nifuroxazide was found to be bio-activated by ALDH1 enzymes, and can potentially kill ALDH1-High melanoma cells in experimental human cell systems and mouse models. High aldehyde dehydrogenase (ALDH) 1 enzymatic activity is a marker for cancer stem cell/tumour initiating cell populations in some cancers. ALDH1 is enriched in melanoma patient samples following BRAF and MEK inhibitor treatments, and it has been proposed that nifuroxazide may be researched in this context.

== USP21 inhibition ==
Recent preclinical studies suggest that nifuroxazide can potentially inhibit USP21, a deubiquitinase implicated in cancer progression, by suppressing its enzymatic activity and reducing the expression of specific microRNAs that regulate USP21, but the solid evidence on potential applications is lacking.
