= Neladalkib =

Anti-cancer medication

Clinical data
- Trade names: Nelkarmi
- Other names: ALK-IN-27, NVL-655, NUV-655
- AHFS/Drugs.com: Nelkarmi
- License data: US DailyMed: Neladalkib
- Routes of administration: By mouth
- Drug class: Antineoplastic
- ATC code: none

Legal status
- Legal status: US: ℞-only

Identifiers
- IUPAC name: (19R)-5-chloro-3-ethyl-16-fluoro-10,19-dimethyl-20-oxa-3,4,10,11,23-pentazapentacyclo[19.3.1.0^{2,6}.0^{8,12}.0^{13,18}]pentacosa-1(25),2(6),4,8,11,13(18),14,16,21,23-decaen-22-amine
- CAS Number: 2739866-40-9
- PubChem CID: 164718816
- IUPHAR/BPS: 13214
- DrugBank: DB21712
- ChemSpider: 129309413
- UNII: J32P26A6BC
- KEGG: D13079
- ChEBI: CHEBI:759941
- ChEMBL: ChEMBL6068023
- PDB ligand: A1IJ8 (PDBe, RCSB PDB)

Chemical and physical data
- Formula: C_{23}H_{22}ClFN_{6}O
- Molar mass: 452.92 g·mol^{−1}
- 3D model (JSmol): Interactive image
- SMILES: CCN1C2=C(CC3=CN(N=C3C4=C(C=C(C=C4)F)[C@H](OC5=C(N=CC2=C5)N)C)C)C(=N1)Cl
- InChI: InChI=InChI=1S/C23H22ClFN6O/c1-4-31-21-13-8-19(23(26)27-10-13)32-12(2)17-9-15(25)5-6-16(17)20-14(11-30(3)28-20)7-18(21)22(24)29-31/h5-6,8-12H,4,7H2,1-3H3,(H2,26,27)/t12-/m1/s1; Key:FWZSCAQEBTVTOM-GFCCVEGCSA-N

Neladalkib, sold under the brand name Nelkarmi, is an anaplastic lymphoma kinase (ALK) inhibitor used for the treatment of non-small cell lung cancer. It is taken by mouth.

The most common adverse reactions were hepatotoxicity, musculoskeletal pain, constipation, dysgeusia, peripheral neuropathy, edema, and fatigue.

Neladalkib was approved for medical use in the United States in November 2026.

== Medical uses ==
Neladalkib is indicated for the treatment of adults with locally advanced or metastatic ALK-positive non-small cell lung cancer who have previously received a prior ALK tyrosine kinase inhibitor consisting of alectinib, or two or more prior ALK tyrosine kinase inhibitors and platinum-based chemotherapy.

== Adverse effects ==
The US prescribing information for neladalkib includes warnings and precautions for hepatotoxicity, renal toxicity, ocular toxicity, creatine phosphokinase elevation, and embryo-fetal toxicity. The most common grade 3 or 4 laboratory abnormalities include increased alanine aminotransferase, increased aspartate aminotransferase, increased creatine phosphokinase, decreased lymphocytes, decreased potassium, and decreased hemoglobin.

== History ==
Safety and efficacy were evaluated in ALKOVE-1, a multi-center, single-arm, open-label, multi-cohort trial in 67 participants who received one prior ALK TKI consisting of alectinib in the metastatic setting and 155 participants who received two or more prior ALK TKIs and platinum-based chemotherapy. The major efficacy outcome measures were confirmed overall response rate (ORR) and duration of response (DOR) according to RECIST v1.1 as assessed by blinded independent central review (BICR). Among participants who received one prior ALK TKI consisting of alectinib (N=67), ORR was 49% (95% CI: 37, 62); 76% of responding participants had a DOR of ≥ 6 months and 52% had a DOR of ≥ 12 months. Among participants who received two or more prior ALK TKIs and platinum-based chemotherapy (N=155), ORR was 32% (95% CI: 24, 40); 69% of responding participants had a DOR of ≥ 6 months and 51% had a DOR of ≥ 12 months.

== Society and culture ==
=== Legal status ===
Neladalkib was approved for medical use in the United States in November 2026. The US Food and Drug Administration (FDA) granted neladalkib breakthrough therapy and orphan drug designations. The FDA granted accelerated approval of Nelkarmi to Nuvalent, a subsidiary of GSK.

=== Names ===
Neladalkib is the international nonproprietary name.

Neladalkib is sold under the brand name Nelkarmi.
