= Naptumomab estafenatox =

- Schematic image of naptumomab estafenatox. V_{H}, V_{L}: variable (antigen binding) domains of antibody fragment C_{H}1, C_{L}: constant domains of antibody fragment SAg: superantigen SEA/E-120

Monoclonal antibody
- Type: Fab fragment
- Source: Mouse
- Target: 5T4

Clinical data
- ATC code: none

Identifiers
- CAS Number: 676258-98-3
- ChemSpider: none
- UNII: 93T929W6LC

Chemical and physical data
- Formula: C_{3255}H_{5025}N_{855}O_{1050}S_{18}
- Molar mass: 73513.02 g·mol^{−1}

Naptumomab estafenatox (ABR-217620) is a drug being developed for the treatment of various types of cancer like non-small cell lung carcinoma and renal cell carcinoma.

== Mechanism of action ==
Chemically, it is a fusion protein consisting of the antigen-binding fragment (Fab) of a monoclonal antibody with the superantigen staphylococcal enterotoxin A (SEA/E-120, "estafenatox"). The Fab binds to 5T4, an antigen expressed by various tumor cells, and the superantigen induces an immune response by activating T lymphocytes.

== See also ==
- Nacolomab tafenatox, a drug with a similar chemical structure and mechanism
