= Nitrafudam =

Antidepressant compound

Identifiers
- CAS Number: 64743-09-5
- PubChem CID: 163304
- ChemSpider: 143312
- UNII: 7R3267A08Y
- ChEMBL: ChEMBL2111024

Chemical and physical data
- Formula: C_{11}H_{9}N_{3}O_{3}
- Molar mass: 231.211 g·mol^{−1}
- 3D model (JSmol): Interactive image
- SMILES: C1=CC=C(C(=C1)C2=CC=C(O2)C(=N)N)[N+](=O)[O-]
- InChI: InChI=1S/C11H9N3O3/c12-11(13)10-6-5-9(17-10)7-3-1-2-4-8(7)14(15)16/h1-6H,(H3,12,13); Key:FYUZOMGBPKUZNJ-UHFFFAOYSA-N

Nitrafudam is an antidepressant compound that was developed in the 1970-1980s. It contains three functional groups: a nitrobenzene, a furan ring and an amidine.

== Synthesis ==
Nitrafudam synthesis

Azo coupling between 2-nitrophenyldiazonium chloride [119-66-4] (1) and furfural (2) leads to 5-(2-nitrophenyl)furfural [20000-96-8] (3). Treatment of the aldehyde with hydroxylamine gives the corresponding aldoxime (PC789659). Upon dehydration, FGI to the nitrile occurs [57666-58-7] (4). A Pinner reaction with anhydrous methanolic hydrogen chloride gives the corresponding imidate (imino-ether) [62821-40-3] (5). An addition-elimination reaction with ammonia causes FGI to an amidine, thus completing the synthesis of nitrafudam (6).
