= Lysine acetylsalicylate =

Chemical compound

Identifiers
- CAS Number: 62952-06-1
- PubChem CID: 44219
- DrugBank: DBSALT003034
- ChemSpider: 40238
- UNII: 2JJ274J145
- KEGG: D07580

Chemical and physical data
- Formula: C_{15}H_{22}N_{2}O_{6}
- Molar mass: 326.349 g·mol^{−1}
- 3D model (JSmol): Interactive image
- SMILES: CC(=O)OC1=CC=CC=C1C(=O)[O-].C(CC[NH3+])CC(C(=O)O)N
- InChI: InChI=1S/C9H8O4.C6H14N2O2/c1-6(10)13-8-5-3-2-4-7(8)9(11)12;7-4-2-1-3-5(8)6(9)10/h2-5H,1H3,(H,11,12);5H,1-4,7-8H2,(H,9,10); Key:JJBCTCGUOQYZHK-UHFFFAOYSA-N

Lysine acetylsalicylate, also known as aspirin DL-lysine or lysine aspirin, is a more soluble form of acetylsalicylic acid (aspirin). As with aspirin itself, it is a nonsteroidal anti-inflammatory drug (NSAID) with analgesic, anti-inflammatory, antithrombotic and antipyretic properties. It is composed of the ammonium form of the amino acid lysine paired with the conjugate base of aspirin.

Lysine acetylsalicylate was developed for intravenous administration in acute pain management, enabling faster onset of action compared to oral aspirin. Adverse effects are similar to those of orally administered aspirin, including upset stomach, and heartburn. In more serious cases, it can cause peptic ulcers, gastric bleeding, and exacerbate asthma. Due to its antithrombotic properties, patients using lysine acetylsalicylate or oral aspirin have an increased risk of bleeding especially for patients on blood thinning medications. It should not be used in children with infections, as it poses a risk of Reye syndrome, nor should it be used in the final trimester of pregnancy due to risks of premature closure of the foramen ovale in the fetal heart.

The therapeutic effects of salicylic acids were first documented in 1763 by Edward Stone, with acetylsalicylic acid being synthesized by Felix Hoffmann, a chemist working under Bayer, in 1897. Acetylsalicylic acid-derived salt compounds were first discovered in 1970, and the synthesis of lysine acetylsalicylate was first documented in 1978.

== Mechanism of action ==
Lysine acetylsalicylate is considered a prodrug, requiring it to be metabolized before displaying its therapeutic properties. After administration, lysine acetylsalicylate is hydrolyzed, separating into lysine and acetylsalicylate compounds.

=== Cyclo-oxygenase enzyme (COX) inhibition ===
Two forms of COX enzymes have been identified, COX-1 and COX-2. COX enzymes are responsible for catalyzing the conversion of arachidonic acid to prostaglandins, which are used as precursors for other substances, in particular thromboxane A2. Thromboxane A2 is a potent platelet activator, inducing changes in platelets that ultimately promote aggregation and the formation of clots. Thromboxane A2 also displays vasoconstrictor properties by acting on vascular smooth muscle cells. Prostaglandins are also important mediators of the inflammatory response, with high levels of prostaglandins being seen in inflamed tissues.

Acetylsalicylate compounds act as inhibitors of COX-1 and COX-2 enzyme activity, enabling the drug to display its antiplatelet and anti-inflammatory properties. The compound irreversibly suppresses COX-1 activity by addition of an acetyl group to a serine amino acid. This disables the binding mechanism of arachidonic acid, inhibiting the synthesis of prostaglandins and thromboxane A2 which stops platelet aggregation and inflammation. The same mechanism is also shown in COX-2 enzymes, albeit with lower efficiency of binding.

=== Other proposed mechanisms ===
Acetylsalicylate compounds are also thought to have other mechanisms that exert anti-inflammatory effects on cells, which are mainly prostaglandin-independent. Acetylsalicylate inhibits neutrophil activation by desensitizing them to endogenous chemical signals such as leukotrienes, stopping the inflammatory cascade. Acetylsalicylate also reduces the expression of nitric oxide synthase, obstructing the synthesis of nitric oxide compounds. Nitric oxide plays a key role in inflammation by activating macrophages and regulating apoptosis. Acetylsalicylate also inhibits the activation of nuclear factor kappa-B, which decreases the expression of pro-inflammatory molecules such as interleukins.

== Chemical properties ==
Lysine acetylsalicylate exists as a white, crystalline substance displaying weakly acidic properties. Lysine acetylsalicylate is generally unstable in a basic medium, readily undergoing a multi-step hydrolysis reaction that is catalyzed by the presence of negatively charged hydroxide ions. The primary target of the hydrolysis reaction is the ester group, dissociating into a carboxylic acid and aromatic alcohol.

=== Synthesis ===
The synthesis of lysine acetylsalicylate requires the precursor sodium salicylate, another salt of salicylic acid. Sodium salicylate is prepared by adding acetylsalicylic acid to a solution of sodium hydrogen carbonate. The solution is then stirred and filtered to produce sodium salicylate crystals, which are dried to remove water.

Sodium salicylate can be synthesized into acetylsalicylate through two methods. The first method is through mixing a 30% sodium salicylate solution with lysine, and heating the mixture under reflux for 40 minutes. Next, the solution is cooled and heated again to evaporate the resulting water. When a precipitate is noticed, the solution is put into a refrigerator until fully crystallized, with the resulting crystals being lysine acetylsalicylate. The second method involves the same process, but the mixture is not initially heated and is instead left at room temperature for 48 hours. Method 1 is noted to obtain a greater yield of lysine acetylsalicylate.

== Pharmacokinetics ==
Lysine acetylsalicylate is normally administered intravenously into the blood due to its high water solubility when compared to only acetylsalicylate. This enables aspirin to be released directly into blood circulation, bypassing the need for absorption through the stomach as well as liver metabolism.

When compared to oral doses of aspirin, lysine acetylsalicylate displays a greater antiplatelet and anti-inflammatory response. Additionally, lysine acetylsalicylate shows a faster onset of action when compared to oral aspirin of an equivalent dose. Lysine acetylsalicylate also displays a shorter mean residence time in the body (0.37 hours) as well as a shorter elimination half-life (17 minutes) when administered intravenously, which could indicate that it displays a shorter duration of exposure. Lysine acetylsalicylate also provides less interpatient variability in antiplatelet properties.

Acetylsalicylate is predominantly metabolized through a conjugation reaction with glycine to form salicyluric acid. Salicyluric acid also acts as the main compound of aspirin excretion, with 98% of aspirin being secreted via this pathway by the kidney. Salicyluric acid can undergo further metabolism to form glucuronide compounds, or hydroxylation to form gentisic acid (1% of total aspirin).

== Medical uses ==
Lysine acetylsalicylate is used acutely in an inpatient setting, for conditions presenting with severe pain, particularly acute migraine attacks and severe headache. It is also used as an ultra-rapid platelet blockade agent for intra-procedural clearance of thrombus, and among patients with an urgent need for antiplatelet therapy without feasible nasogastric or oral access. These include, but are not limited to: patients with acute ischemic stroke, arterial dissection, and those undergoing endovascular stent placement.

=== Pain ===
In an inpatient setting, lysine acetylsalicylate has been shown to be safe and effective in the inpatient management of severe headache and migraine. Two randomized trials found that when combined with metoclopramide, lysine acetylsalicylate has comparable efficacy to sumatriptan for migraine.

=== Antiplatelet ===
Clinical trials on the use of lysine acetylsalicylate as an antiplatelet for acute coronary syndrome and chronic coronary syndrome finds comparable efficacy of lysine acetylsalicylate to oral aspirin. The economic efficiency of using lysine acetylsalicylate in the secondary prevention of ischemic stroke and myocardial infarction has also been demonstrated in one pharmacoeconomic study. Lysine acetylsalicylate is generally reserved for patients with urgent need of antiplatelet therapy with no oral or nasogastric access. However, its rapid onset through IV administration makes it applicable for thrombus clearance during stent placement and other surgical procedures.

=== Diagnosis of NSAID-exacerbated respiratory disease ===
NSAID-exacerbated respiratory disease refers to the combination of NSAID intolerance, asthma, with chronic rhinosinusitis with nasal polyposis. Lysine acetylsalicylate is used as a challenge test to diagnose NSAID-exacerbated respiratory disease. Drops of lysine acetylsalicylate are instilled via pipette or spray to both nostrils. Patients with NSAID-exacerbated respiratory disease had a significant increase in symptoms compared to those without NSAID-exacerbated respiratory disease.

== Side effects ==
=== Contraindications ===
All NSAIDs, including aspirin, should be avoided 20 weeks or later in pregnancy to prevent risk of kidney problems in unborn babies. Due to linkage with Reye syndrome, aspirin should not be used in children under the age of 16 showing signs of recovering from infection. Those who are allergic to, or intolerant of NSAIDs such as ibuprofen and naproxen should not use lysine acetylsalicylate. Lysine acetylsalicylate is avoided in patients with Glucose-6-phosphate dehydrogenase deficiency due to the risk of hemolytic anemia.

=== Gastrointestinal ===
Non-selective blockade of COX by NSAIDs such as lysine acetylsalicylate results in the attenuation of gastric defense, resulting in an increased risk of gastrointestinal bleeding. As such, lysine acetylsalicylate should be used with caution in patients with peptic ulcer or gastritis. Combining aspirin with other NSAIDs has been shown to drastically increase the risk of gastrointestinal bleeding and should be done with caution.

=== Asthma and NSAID-exacerbated respiratory disease ===
Blockade of COX-1 increases activation of the leukotriene pathway, resulting in the release of cysteinyl leukotrienes which are potent bronchoconstrictors. Leukotriene is also a major factor in the pathogenesis of asthma. As such, caution should be applied in the use of lysine acetylsalicylate in patients with asthma.

Similarly, the increase in cysteinyl leukotrienes can also cause hyperreactivity in healthy patients, leading to NSAID-exacerbated respiratory disease. Lysine acetylsalicylate should be used with caution in patients diagnosed with NSAID-exacerbated respiratory disease.

=== Bleeding ===
Owing to its antiplatelet properties, use of oral aspirin and lysine acetylsalicylate will increase the risk of bleeding. As such, patients with hemophilia or other bleeding tendencies should not use oral aspirin nor lysine acetylsalicylate. The risk of bleeding is increased for those using warfarin and alcohol.
