= Nipocalimab =

Chemical compound

Monoclonal antibody
- Type: Whole antibody
- Source: Human
- Target: FcRn

Clinical data
- Trade names: Imaavy
- Other names: JNJ-80202135, M281, nipocalimab-aahu
- AHFS/Drugs.com: Monograph
- MedlinePlus: a625078
- License data: US DailyMed: Nipocalimab
- Routes of administration: Intravenous infusion
- ATC code: L04AL03 (WHO)

Legal status
- Legal status: CA: ℞-only Schedule D; US: ℞-only; EU: Rx-only

Identifiers
- CAS Number: 2211985-36-1
- PubChem CID: 405226533
- DrugBank: DB16257
- UNII: 87M90CV8NC
- KEGG: D11666

Chemical and physical data
- Formula: C_{6266}H_{9722}N_{1670}O_{1992}S_{46}
- Molar mass: 141797.16 g·mol^{−1}

Nipocalimab, sold under the brand name Imaavy, is a monoclonal antibody used for the treatment of generalized myasthenia gravis or warm autoimmune hemolytic anemia. It is a neonatal Fc receptor blocker. It is a high affinity, fully human, aglycosylated, effectorless immunoglobulin G (IgG) anti-FcRn monoclonal antibody. Nipocalimab is a human IgG1 monoclonal antibody that binds to the neonatal Fc receptor (FcRn), thereby decreasing the levels of circulating IgG, including pathogenic IgG autoantibodies.

The most common adverse reactions in people with warm autoimmune hemolytic anemia include peripheral edema (swelling of the lower legs, ankles, feet caused by a build-up of fluid in body tissues), diarrhea and fever. Other side effects are infusion-related reactions, including headache, fatigue, influenza-like illness, rash, nausea, dizziness, chills, and erythema (redness of the skin).

Nipocalimab was approved for medical use in the United States in April 2025, in the European Union in November 2025, and in Canada in January 2026.

== Medical uses ==
Nipocalimab is indicated for the treatment of generalized myasthenia gravis in people aged twelve years of age and older who are anti-acetylcholine receptor or anti-muscle-specific tyrosine kinase antibody positive; or for the treatment of warm autoimmune hemolytic anemia in people aged twelve years of age and older currently or previously treated with corticosteroids.

Warm autoimmune hemolytic anemia is a rare blood disorder where the immune system mistakenly attacks and destroys the body's own red blood cells — a process called hemolysis. This destruction happens faster than the body can replace the red blood cells, leading to a shortage of healthy red blood cells (anemia).

== History ==
Nipocalimab was developed by Momenta Pharmaceuticals before it was acquired by Johnson & Johnson in August 2020.

Nipocalimab received rare pediatric disease designation from the US Food and Drug Administration (FDA) for the prevention of hemolytic disease of the fetus and newborn. Additionally, the FDA granted nipocalimab orphan drug designation in hemolytic disease of the fetus and newborn. In 2019, nipocalimab received orphan medicinal product designation by the European Medicines Agency for the treatment of HDFN.

In February 2024, nipocalimab was granted breakthrough therapy designation by the FDA for the treatment of alloimmunized pregnant individuals at high risk of severe hemolytic disease of the fetus and newborn.

In August 2024, Johnson & Johnson applied for FDA approval of nipocalimab for the treatment of people living with generalized myasthenia gravis. The application is based on data from the phase III Vivacity-MG3 study.

In November 2024, nipocalimab was granted breakthrough therapy designation by the FDA as a treatment for adults with moderate-to-severe Sjögren's disease. The decision was based on the results from the phase II DAHLIAS study evaluating the effects of nipocalimab in more than 160 adults with moderately-to-severely active primary Sjögren's disease who were seropositive for anti-Ro60 and/or anti-Ro52 IgG antibodies.

In August 2026, the FDA approved nipocalimab for the treatment of warm autoimmune hemolytic anemia in people aged twelve years of age and older currently or previously treated with corticosteroids. The FDA based its approval on results from the wAIHA Study (NCT04119050), a 24-week, randomized, double-blind, placebo-controlled clinical trial. The study enrolled participants with a confirmed wAIHA diagnosis of at least three months who had low hemoglobin levels (below 10 g/dL), evidence of active red blood cell destruction (hemolysis), and a positive direct antiglobulin test (DAT) - a blood test that detects antibodies attacking red blood cells. All participants had previously received or were currently receiving treatment for warm autoimmune hemolytic anemia, reflecting a population with a significant unmet medical need. The FDA granted the application for nipocalimab fast track, priority review, and orphan drug designations for this indication. The FDA granted approval of Imaavy to Janssen Biotech.

== Society and culture ==
=== Legal status ===
Nipocalimab was approved for medical use in the United States in April 2025.

In September 2025, the Committee for Medicinal Products for Human Use of the European Medicines Agency adopted a positive opinion, recommending the granting of a marketing authorization for the medicinal product Imaavy, intended for the treatment of generalized myasthenia gravis. The applicant for this medicinal product is Janssen-Cilag International NV. Nipocalimab was authorized for medical use in the European Union in November 2025.

=== Names ===
Nipocalimab is the international nonproprietary name.

Nipocalimab is sold under the brand name Imaavy.
