= Nipradilol =

Names
- IUPAC name [8-[2-hydroxy-3-(propan-2-ylamino)propoxy]-3,4-dihydro-2H-chromen-3-yl] nitrate

Identifiers
CAS Number	81486-22-8
3D model (JSmol)	Interactive image
ChemSpider	65005
PubChem CID	72006
UNII	FVM336I71Y
CompTox Dashboard (EPA)	DTXSID30868615
- InChI: InChI=1S/C15H22N2O6/c1-10(2)16-7-12(18)8-21-14-5-3-4-11-6-13(23-17(19)20)9-22-15(11)14/h3-5,10,12-13,16,18H,6-9H2,1-2H3 Key: OMCPLEZZPVJJIS-UHFFFAOYSA-N
- SMILES: CC(C)NCC(COC1=CC=CC2=C1OCC(C2)O[N+](=O)[O-])O

Properties
Chemical formula	C_{15}H_{22}N_{2}O_{6}
Molar mass	326.349 g·mol^{−1}
- Except where otherwise noted, data are given for materials in their standard state (at 25 °C [77 °F], 100 kPa). Infobox references

Nipradilol is a beta blocker and nitric oxide donor.
