= Naranol =

Tetracyclic drug

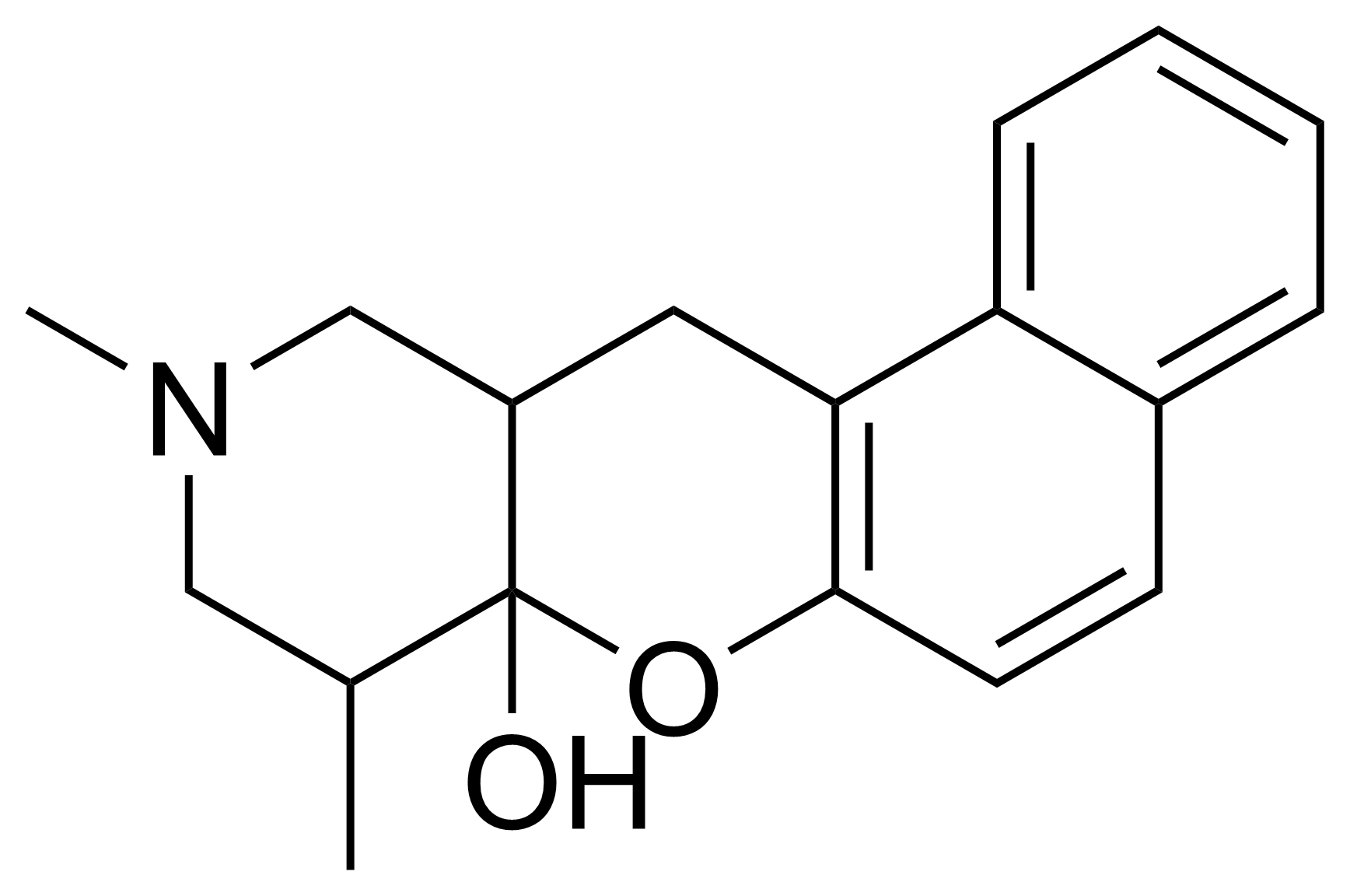

Clinical data
- ATC code: None

Identifiers
- IUPAC name: 8,10-dimethyl-8,9,10,11,11a,12-hexahydro-7aH-benzo[5,6]chromeno[3,2-c]pyridin-7a-ol
- CAS Number: 22292-91-7 34256-91-2 (hydrochloride)
- PubChem CID: 31117
- ChemSpider: 28874
- UNII: 752168P7XM
- CompTox Dashboard (EPA): DTXSID50865040

Chemical and physical data
- Formula: C_{18}H_{21}NO_{2}
- Molar mass: 283.371 g·mol^{−1}
- 3D model (JSmol): Interactive image
- SMILES: OC43Oc2c(c1ccccc1cc2)CC4CN(CC3C)C

Naranol (W-5494A) is a drug having a tetracyclic structure. It was synthesized in the late 1960s, and was reported to have antidepressant, anxiolytic, and antipsychotic activities, but was never marketed.

== See also ==
- Tetracyclic
