= Nifuratel =

Chemical compound

Clinical data
- AHFS/Drugs.com: International Drug Names
- ATC code: G01AX05 (WHO)

Identifiers
- IUPAC name: 5-[(Methylthio)methyl]-3-{[(1E)-(5-nitro-2-furyl)methylene]amino}-1,3-oxazolidin-2-one
- CAS Number: 4936-47-4
- PubChem CID: 6433427
- ChemSpider: 4938579
- UNII: U60U6P08SP
- KEGG: D01050
- ECHA InfoCard: 100.023.251

Chemical and physical data
- Formula: C_{10}H_{11}N_{3}O_{5}S
- Molar mass: 285.27 g·mol^{−1}
- 3D model (JSmol): Interactive image
- SMILES: CSCC1CN(C(=O)O1)/N=C/C2=CC=C(O2)[N+](=O)[O-]
- InChI: InChI=1S/C10H11N3O5S/c1-19-6-8-5-12(10(14)18-8)11-4-7-2-3-9(17-7)13(15)16/h2-4,8H,5-6H2,1H3/b11-4+; Key:SRQKTCXJCCHINN-NYYWCZLTSA-N

Nifuratel (brand name Macmiror, or — in combination with nystatin, — Macmiror Complex) is a drug used in gynecology. It is a local antiprotozoal and antifungal agent that may also be given orally. Nifuratel is not approved for use in the United States.

Nifuratel appears to have a broad antibacterial spectrum of action and is effective against Chlamydia trachomatis and Mycoplasma spp. as well as fungal infections from Candida spp.

Taken orally, or as a vaginal pessary, it is used in the treatment of a wide range of infections of the genito-urinary tract, especially if there is no accurate diagnosis available. For example, it may be used in the treatment of women exhibiting vaginal discharge where there is uncertainty as to whether the cause is Trichomonas vaginalis or Candida strains such as Candida albicans.

Side effects appear to be minimal or non-existent and it has a safe toxicological profile.
