= Nalmexone =

Chemical compound

Clinical data
- ATC code: None

Identifiers
- IUPAC name: (5α)-3,14-dihydroxy-17-(3-methyl-2-buten-1-yl)-4,5-epoxymorphinan-6-one
- CAS Number: 16676-26-9 16291-05-7 (HCl)
- PubChem CID: 5360516
- ChemSpider: 4514525
- UNII: AIB278UKIG
- CompTox Dashboard (EPA): DTXSID80168172

Chemical and physical data
- Formula: C_{21}H_{25}NO_{4}
- Molar mass: 355.434 g·mol^{−1}
- 3D model (JSmol): Interactive image
- SMILES: O=C4[C@@H]5Oc1c2c(ccc1O)C[C@H]3N(CC[C@]25[C@@]3(O)CC4)C\C=C(/C)C
- InChI: InChI=1S/C21H25NO4/c1-12(2)6-9-22-10-8-20-17-13-3-4-14(23)18(17)26-19(20)15(24)5-7-21(20,25)16(22)11-13/h3-4,6,16,19,23,25H,5,7-11H2,1-2H3/t16-,19+,20+,21-/m1/s1; Key:OHKCLOQPSLQCQR-MBPVOVBZSA-N

Nalmexone (INN; also known as nalmexone hydrochloride (USAN) or by the development codes EN-1620A and UM-592) is a semisynthetic, opioid partial agonist or mixed agonist-antagonist with both analgesic and narcotic antagonist properties that was never marketed. In clinical studies it was found to have comparable analgesic efficacy to morphine, though with several-fold reduced potency. In addition, nalmexone's side effects, the most common of which were sleepiness and sweating, were reported to be similar to those of morphine, albeit with a noticeably higher degree of incidence.

== Synthesis ==
Nalmexone can be synthesized from oxymorphone:

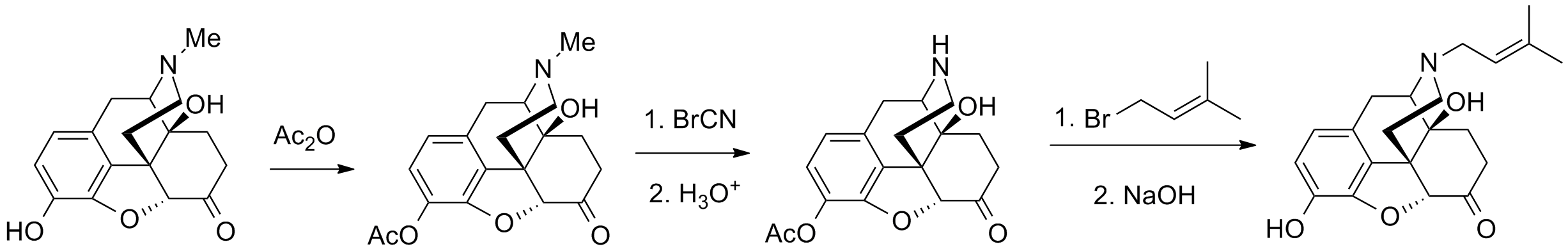
Nalmexone synthesis

== See also ==
- Nalbuphine
- Oxymorphone
- Naloxone
- Naltrexone
- Pentazocine
