= Nafoxadol =

Chemical compound

Clinical data
- ATC code: None

Identifiers
- IUPAC name: 5-(2-naphthyl)-6,8-dioxa-3-azabicyclo[3.2.1]octane
- CAS Number: 84145-90-4 84509-31-9 (HCl)
- PubChem CID: 3047778
- ChemSpider: 2310097
- UNII: EO8XJ1O0JY

Chemical and physical data
- Formula: C_{15}H_{15}NO_{2}
- Molar mass: 241.290 g·mol^{−1}
- 3D model (JSmol): Interactive image
- SMILES: O1CC4OC1(c3cc2ccccc2cc3)CNC4
- InChI: InChI=1S/C15H15NO2/c1-2-4-12-7-13(6-5-11(12)3-1)15-10-16-8-14(18-15)9-17-15/h1-7,14,16H,8-10H2; Key:CQBDDBLIDNKCRV-UHFFFAOYSA-N

Nafoxadol (INN) is an analgesic drug which was never marketed.
