= PRL-8-53 =

Chemical compound

Clinical data
- Routes of administration: Oral
- ATC code: none

Legal status
- Legal status: In general: unscheduled

Identifiers
- IUPAC name: Methyl 3-[2-[benzyl(methyl)amino]ethyl]benzoate
- CAS Number: 51352-88-6 51352-87-5 (HCl)
- PubChem CID: 39988
- ChemSpider: 36560
- UNII: BM2TE2XHK6
- CompTox Dashboard (EPA): DTXSID101350483

Chemical and physical data
- Formula: C_{18}H_{21}NO_{2}
- Molar mass: 283.371 g·mol^{−1}
- 3D model (JSmol): Interactive image
- SMILES: CN(CCc1cccc(c1)C(=O)OC)Cc2ccccc2
- InChI: InChI=1S/C18H21NO2/c1-19(14-16-7-4-3-5-8-16)12-11-15-9-6-10-17(13-15)18(20)21-2/h3-10,13H,11-12,14H2,1-2H3; Key:IGJQEMHBYKNIQR-UHFFFAOYSA-N

PRL-8-53 is a nootropic substituted phenethylamine that has been shown to act as a hypermnesic drug in humans; it was first synthesized by medical chemistry professor Nikolaus Hansl at Creighton University in the 1970s as part of his work on amino ethyl meta benzoic acid esters.

== Mechanism of action ==
The exact mechanism of action of PRL-8-53 remains unknown. Doses up to 200 mg/kg are not observed to have stimulant properties, and a dosage of 20 mg/kg does not potentiate the effects of dextroamphetamine in rats. It displays possible cholinergic properties, and potentiates dopamine while partially inhibiting serotonin. PRL-8-53 reverses the catatonic and ptotic effects of reserpine.

== Toxicity ==
PRL-8-53 is relatively non-toxic, with an oral LD_{50} in mice of 860 mg/kg, giving the drug a high therapeutic index. Doses above 8 mg/kg have brief hypotensive effects in canines. High doses depress motor activity in the rat and mouse, with the ED_{50} for a 50% reduction in motor activity of mice at 160 mg/kg. PRL-8-53 displays spasmolytic effects.

== Reasons for discontinuation ==
PRL-8-53's development was not pursued further, despite not exhibiting side effects in human or animal trials that would warrant discontinuation. Termination of further research may have been due to factors including the retirement of Dr. Nikolaus Hansl and a lawsuit filed between Hansl and Creighton University in 1985.

=== Hansl v. Creighton University ===
On July 1, 1985, Dr. Nikolaus Hansl entered into a settlement agreement with Creighton University. The terms of the agreement guaranteed Dr. Hansl access to his laboratory facilities and office space at the university for a period of 2 years. Upon returning from a 4-month absence. Hansl found that the refrigerator he had used to store various experimental compounds had been unplugged, purportedly rendering the compounds unusable.

=== Patent ===
Dr. Hansl's patent for the synthesis of PRL-8-53 has expired.

== Synonyms ==
Methyl 3-(2-(benzylmethylamino)ethyl)benzoate hydrochloride
3-(2-benzylmethylaminoethyl) benzoic acid methyl ester hydrochloride
3-(2-(Methyl(phenylmethyl)amino)ethyl)benzoic acid methyl ester hydrochloride

== See also ==
- Nootropic
