= Nifurzide =

Chemical compound

Clinical data
- AHFS/Drugs.com: International Drug Names
- ATC code: A07AX04 (WHO)

Identifiers
- IUPAC name: 5-Nitro-N′-[(1E,2E)-3-(5-nitro-2-furyl)-2-propen-1-ylidene]-2-thiophenecarbohydrazide
- CAS Number: 39978-42-2
- PubChem CID: 9571044
- ChemSpider: 7845510
- UNII: Z35R6K4C26
- KEGG: D07251
- ECHA InfoCard: 100.049.735

Chemical and physical data
- Formula: C_{12}H_{8}N_{4}O_{6}S
- Molar mass: 336.28 g·mol^{−1}
- 3D model (JSmol): Interactive image
- SMILES: [O-][N+](=O)c1ccc(o1)/C=C/C=N/NC(=O)c2ccc(s2)[N+](=O)[O-]
- InChI: InChI=1S/C12H8N4O6S/c17-12(9-4-6-11(23-9)16(20)21)14-13-7-1-2-8-3-5-10(22-8)15(18)19/h1-7H,(H,14,17)/b2-1+,13-7+; Key:IDUMOVRJNBNOTR-BIZLIJPVSA-N

Nifurzide is a nitrofuran derivative and intestinal anti-infectious agent active against Escherichia coli.

== Synthesis ==

Esterification of 5-nitrothiophene-2-carboxylic acid (1) with ethanol gives the ester (2). Treatment with hydrazine forms its hydrazide (3). Nifurzide is the hydrazone formed between (3) and 5-nitrofuran-2-acrylaldehyde (4).
