= Nitrofurazone =

Chemical compound

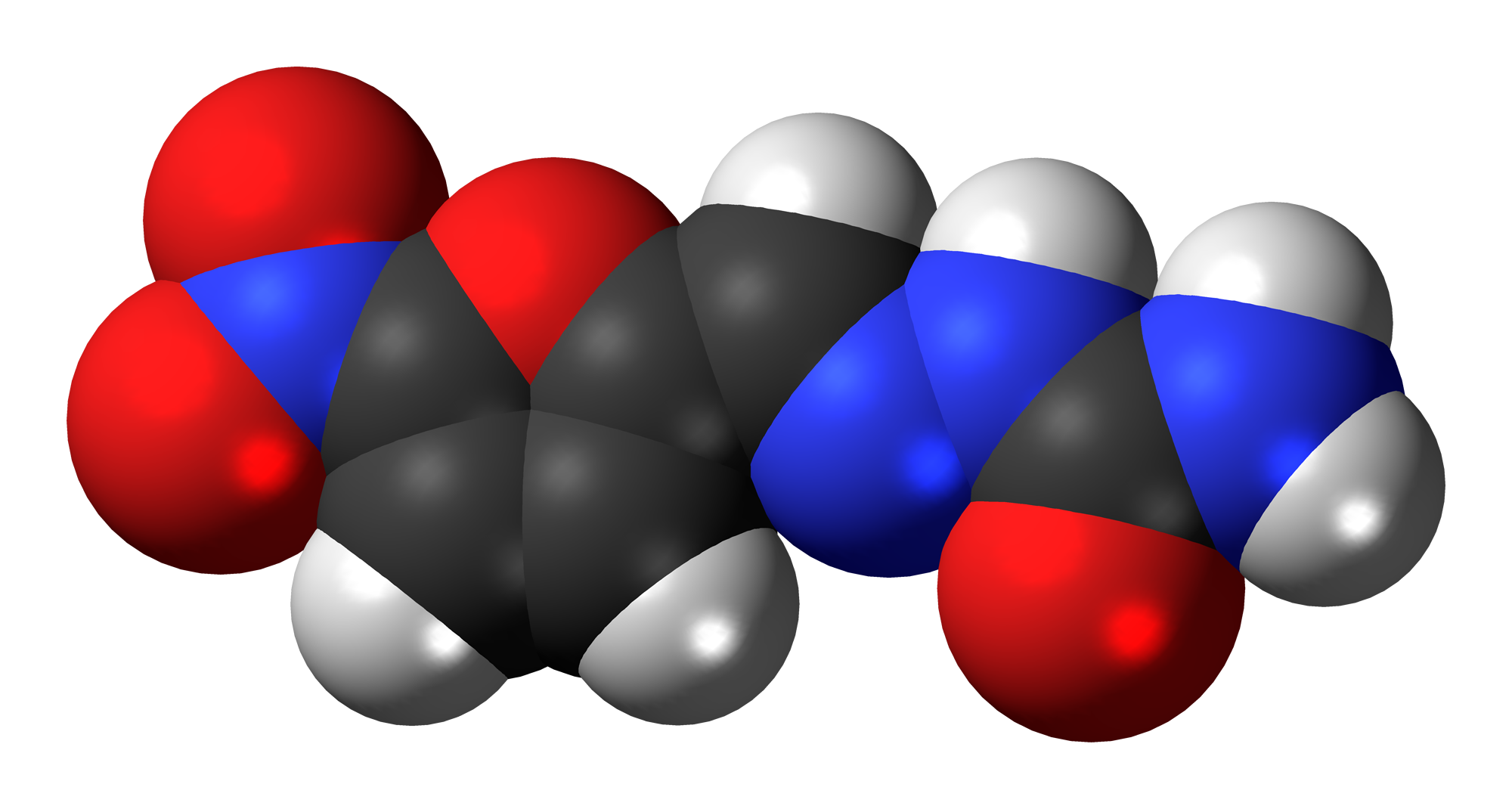

Clinical data
- Trade names: Aldomycin, Amifur, Chemfuran, Coxistat, Furacin, Furan-2, Furacinetten, Furaplast, Furazol W, Furesol Furracoccid, Mammex, Nefco, Nifuzon, Nitrofural, Vabrocid
- AHFS/Drugs.com: Micromedex Detailed Consumer Information
- ATC code: B05CA03 (WHO) D08AF01 (WHO) D09AA03 (WHO) (dressing) P01CC02 (WHO) S01AX04 (WHO) S02AA02 (WHO) QG01AX90 (WHO) QP51AC02 (WHO)

Legal status
- Legal status: US: Discontinued

Pharmacokinetic data
- Elimination half-life: 5 hours

Identifiers
- IUPAC name: (2E)-2-[(5-Nitro-2-furyl)methylene]hydrazine carboxamide
- CAS Number: 59-87-0
- PubChem CID: 5447130
- DrugBank: DB00336
- ChemSpider: 4566720
- UNII: X8XI70B5Z6
- KEGG: C08042
- ChEBI: CHEBI:44368
- ChEMBL: ChEMBL869
- CompTox Dashboard (EPA): DTXSID5020944
- ECHA InfoCard: 100.000.403

Chemical and physical data
- Formula: C_{6}H_{6}N_{4}O_{4}
- Molar mass: 198.138 g·mol^{−1}
- 3D model (JSmol): Interactive image
- SMILES: O=[N+]([O-])c1oc(/C=N/NC(=O)N)cc1
- InChI: InChI=1S/C6H6N4O4/c7-6(11)9-8-3-4-1-2-5(14-4)10(12)13/h1-3H,(H3,7,9,11)/b8-3+; Key:IAIWVQXQOWNYOU-FPYGCLRLSA-N

Nitrofurazone (INN, trade name Furacin) is an antimicrobial organic compound belonging to the nitrofuran class. It is most commonly used as a topical antibiotic ointment. It is effective against gram-positive bacteria, gram-negative bacteria, and can be used in the treatment of trypanosomiasis. Its use in medicine has become less frequent, as safer and more effective products have become available. Nitrofurazone is listed under California Prop 65, and has demonstrated clear evidence to be mutagenic and carcinogenic during animal studies, and has been discontinued for human use in the USA. The substance is pale yellow and crystalline. It was once widely used as an antibiotic for livestock.

== Medical uses ==
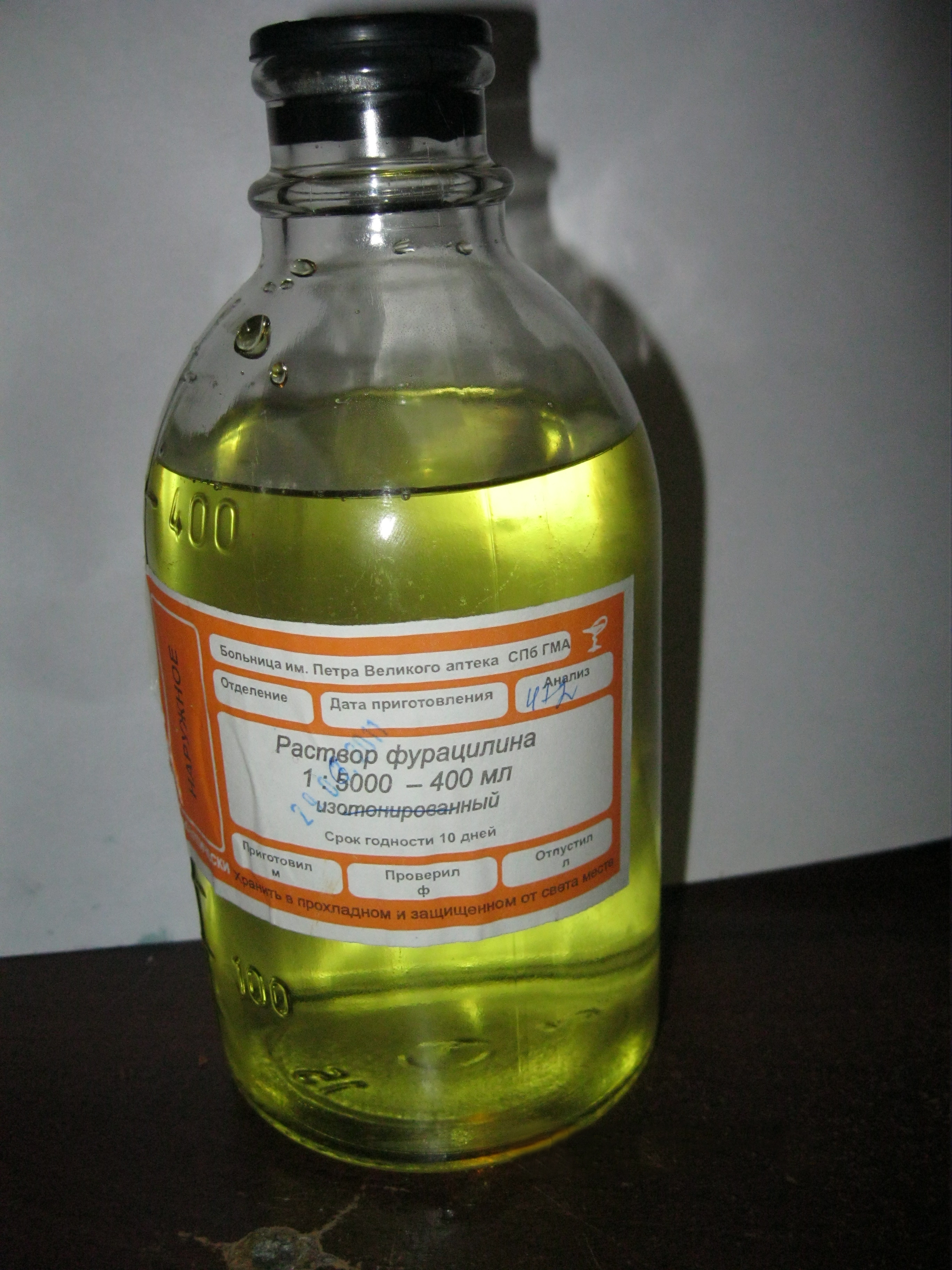
Drugstore-made ~400 mL aqueous solution of Furacilin (Russian: Фурацилин, nitrofural), 1 : 5000 (0.2 mg/mL or 0.02%), ready for topical use.

=== Human use ===
Nitrofurazone was previously available as a prescription in the U.S., and was indicated as a topical solution, topical cream, or topical ointment for the treatment of bacterial skin infections, wounds, burns, and ulcers. It was also used as a prophylactic measure to prevent infection that could potentially result in skin graft rejection. Nitrofurazone is still very popular as a topical solution for the treatment of tonsillitis in Russia.

=== Animal use ===
Nitrofurazone is indicated for topical use in dogs, cats, and horses, for the treatment or prophylactic treatment of superficial bacterial infections, burns, and cutaneous ulcers. Preparations for treating infections, such as fin rot, in ornamental fish are also still commercially available. The use of nitrofurazone, or related compounds, in animals raised for human consumption has been strictly banned.

== Pharmacokinetics ==
The metabolism of topically applied nitrofurazone is thought to be by 5-nitro reduction and cleavage of the -CH=N- linkage to generate a reactive species which can covalently bond to cellular macromolecules, none of the end products are thought to be antimicrobial.

== Mechanism of action ==
The mechanism of action is not fully understood, but nitrofurazone's antimicrobial properties are suspected to be due to the interference of DNA synthesis in the microorganism by inhibiting certain enzymes that are involved with glycolysis. Other enzymes this may affect include, pyruvate dehydrogenase, citrate synthetase, malate dehydrogenase, glutathione reductase, and pyruvate decarboxylase.

== Adverse effects ==
Adverse effects for topical use are generally mild and include, erythema, pruritus, dermatitis, rash, edema or inflammation.

== Contraindications ==
People with chronic kidney disease and large total body surface area (TBSA) burns should not use nitrofurazone, as topical preparations commonly contain polyethylene glycol, which is readily absorbed through the skin. Rapid absorption of the medication induces increased serum osmolalities and anion gap, leading to death. Symptoms are similar to ethylene glycol poisoning, in that increased serum calcium levels occur concurrently with decreased ionized calcium.

Nitrofurans have been found in honey, meat and seafood. In people who have glucose-6-phosphate dehydrogenase deficiency (G-6-PD deficiency), ingestion of fish, poultry, or other foodstuff that has been treated with nitrofurans, will likely suffer from hemolysis of red blood cells as a result of eating the contaminated food.

== Toxicities ==
Nitrofurazone is suspected to be a human carcinogen and is included in California's list of toxic chemicals as defined by Proposition 65. Studies demonstrate that nitrofurazone induces mammary tumors (fibroadenoma and adenocarcinoma) in rats and ovarian tumors in mice. In addition, animal studies demonstrated an increased incidence in convulsive seizures, ovarian atrophy, testicular degeneration, and degeneration of articular cartilage. Proper personal protective equipment should be utilized when handling nitrofurazone.
