= Englitazone =

Chemical compound

Clinical data
- ATC code: none

Identifiers
- IUPAC name: 5-[(2-Benzyl-3,4-dihydro-2H-chromen-6-yl)methyl]-1,3-thiazolidine-2,4-dione
- CAS Number: 109229-58-5
- PubChem CID: 60303
- ChemSpider: 54375
- UNII: ZQW5577C3O
- ChEMBL: ChEMBL17669
- CompTox Dashboard (EPA): DTXSID80883191

Chemical and physical data
- Formula: C_{20}H_{19}NO_{3}S
- Molar mass: 353.44 g·mol^{−1}
- 3D model (JSmol): Interactive image
- SMILES: O=C1NC(=O)SC1Cc4ccc3OC(Cc2ccccc2)CCc3c4

Englitazone is a hypoglycemic agent of thiazolidinedione (glitazone) class.

== See also ==
- Ciglitazone
- Darglitazone
- Netoglitazone
- Troglitazone
- Rivoglitazone—currently in clinical trials
- Pioglitazone, lobeglitazone, rosiglitazone—the only ones currently in clinical use
