= Criticism of the Food and Drug Administration =

Numerous governmental and non-governmental organizations have criticized the U. S. Food and Drug Administration for alleged excessive and/or insufficient regulation. The U.S. Food and Drug Administration (FDA) is an agency of the United States Department of Health and Human Services and is responsible for the safety regulation of most types of foods, dietary supplements, drugs, vaccines, biological medical products, blood products, medical devices, radiation-emitting devices, veterinary products, and cosmetics. The FDA also enforces section 361 of the Public Health Service Act and the associated regulations, including sanitation requirements on interstate travel as well as specific rules for control of disease on products ranging from animals sold as pets to donations of human blood and tissue.

A $1.8 million 2006 Institute of Medicine report on pharmaceutical regulation in the U.S. found major deficiencies in the FDA system for ensuring the safety of drugs on the American market. Overall, the authors called for an increase in the regulatory powers, funding, and independence of the FDA.

== Charges of over-regulation ==
A group of critics claim that the FDA possesses excessive regulatory authority.

=== Alleged problems in the drug approval process ===
==== Bias against approving worthy drugs ====
Economist Milton Friedman has claimed that the FDA regulatory process is inherently biased against approval of some worthy drugs, because the adverse effects of wrongfully banning a useful drug are undetectable, while the consequences of mistakenly approving a harmful drug are highly publicised and that therefore the FDA will take the action that will result in the least public condemnation of the FDA regardless of the health consequences.

==== Increased costs and delays from Kefauver Harris Amendment ====
Friedman and others have argued that delays in the approval process have cost lives. The thalidomide birth defects crisis led to passage of the 1962 Kefauver Harris Amendment, which required proof of efficacy in addition to safety for approval of new drugs — despite the fact that the thalidomide crisis was entirely a safety issue. Proving efficacy is much more expensive and time-consuming than proving safety. By requiring proof of efficacy in addition to safety, the Kefauver Harris Amendment added considerable cost and delay to the drug approval process — which critics say may well have cost many more lives than it was said to save. Prior to passage of the Kefauver Harris Amendment, the average time from the filing of an investigational new drug application (IND) to approval was 7 months. By 1998, it took an average of 7.3 years from the date of filing to approval. Prior to the 1990s, the mean time for new drug approvals was shorter in Europe than in the United States, although that difference has since disappeared.

==== Delays in HIV/AIDS drug approvals and subsequent reforms ====
Concerns about the length of the drug approval process were brought to the fore early in the AIDS epidemic. In the late 1980s, ACT-UP and other HIV activist organizations accused the FDA of unnecessarily delaying the approval of medications to fight HIV and opportunistic infections, and staged large protests, such as a confrontational October 11, 1988, action at the FDA campus which resulted in nearly 180 arrests. In August 1990, Louis Lasagna, then chairman of a presidential advisory panel on drug approval, estimated that thousands of lives were lost each year due to delays in approval and marketing of drugs for cancer and AIDS. Partly in response to these criticisms, the FDA introduced expedited approval of drugs for life-threatening diseases and expanded pre-approval access to drugs for patients with limited treatment options. All of the initial drugs approved for the treatment of HIV/AIDS were approved through accelerated approval mechanisms. For example, a "treatment IND" was issued for the first HIV drug, AZT, in 1985, and approval was granted 2 years later, in 1987. Three of the first 5 HIV medications were approved in the United States before they were approved in any other country.

=== Allegations that FDA regulation causes higher drug prices ===
==== High R&D costs from FDA-required clinical trials and delays ====
Studies published in 2003 by Joseph DiMasi and colleagues estimated an average cost of approximately $800 million to bring a new drug to market, while a 2006 study estimated the cost to be anywhere from $500 million to $2 billion. The consumer advocacy group Public Citizen, using a different methodology, estimated the average cost for development to be under $200 million, about 29% of which is spent on FDA-required clinical trials. DiMasi rejects the claim that high R&D costs alone are responsible for high drug prices. Instead, in a published letter, DiMasi writes, "...longer development times increase R&D costs and shorten the period during which drug companies can earn the returns they need to make investment financially viable. Other things being equal, longer development times reduce innovation incentives. As a consequence, fewer new therapies might be developed."

==== Patent protection and FDA requirements creating monopolies ====
Economist Gary S. Becker, who won the Nobel Memorial Prize in Economics, has argued that FDA-required clinical trials for new drugs do contribute to high drug prices for consumers, mainly because of patent protection that provides a temporary monopoly which disallows cheaper alternatives from entering the market. He advocates dropping many FDA requirements, many of which provide no additional safety or valuable information, as this would hasten the development of new drugs, because they would be faster to bring to market, thereby increasing supply, and as a consequence would lead to lower prices.

== Charges of under-regulation ==
In addition to those who see the FDA as a source of excessive regulation, other critics believe that the FDA does not regulate some products strictly enough. According to this view, the FDA allows unsafe drugs on the market because of pressure from pharmaceutical companies, fails to ensure safety in drug storage and labeling, and allows the use of dangerous agricultural chemicals, food additives, and food processing techniques.

A $1.8 million 2006 Institute of Medicine report on pharmaceutical regulation in the U.S. found major deficiencies in the current FDA system for ensuring the safety of drugs on the American market. Overall, the authors called for an increase in the regulatory powers, funding, and independence of the FDA.

=== Allegations that the FDA covered up exportation of unsafe products ===
==== Failure to enforce export restrictions on unsafe blood products ====
In the 1980s, Cutter Laboratories introduced a heat-treated version of Factor VIII concentrate in the US, designed to eliminate the risk of HIV transmission. However, Cutter continued to market the untreated product overseas, potentially spreading HIV while the safer product was marketed in the US.

Cutter initially had a voluntary agreement with the FDA to stop marketing the untreated product. However, when it became clear that Cutter was not complying with the agreement, the FDA ordered the company to cease marketing untreated blood products, stating: "It was unacceptable for them to ship that material overseas."

==== Alleged cover-up of exportation issues ====
Following Cutter's non-compliance, critics allege that the FDA sought to cover up Cutter Laboratories' non-compliance with its agreement to stop exporting unsafe Factor VIII blood products, even after issuing a mandatory order to cease. According to Cutter's internal documents, the FDA asked that the issue be "quietly solved without alerting the Congress, the medical community and the public", leading to charges that the FDA was complicit in covering up Cutter's actions.

=== Allegations that unsafe drugs are approved ===
==== Oversight of safety concerns in drug approvals ====
Some critics believe that the FDA has been apt to overlook safety concerns in approving new drugs, and is slow to withdraw approved drugs once evidence shows them to be unsafe. Rezulin (troglitazone) and Vioxx (rofecoxib) are high-profile examples of drugs approved by the FDA which were later withdrawn from the market for posing unacceptable risks to patients.

==== Delays in withdrawing unsafe drugs ====
Critics argue that the FDA is slow to withdraw approved drugs once evidence shows them to be unsafe. Troglitazone is a diabetes drug that was also available abroad at the time the FDA approved it. Post-marketing safety data indicated that the drug had dangerous side-effects (in this case liver failure). The drug was pulled off that market in the UK in 1997, but was not withdrawn by the FDA until 2000, before which time it is claimed that thousands of Americans were injured or killed by the drug.

In the case of Vioxx, a pre-approval study indicated that a group taking the drug had four times the risk of heart attacks when compared to another group of patients taking another anti-inflammatory, naproxen. The FDA approval board accepted the manufacturer's argument that this was due to a previously unknown cardioprotective effect of naproxen, rather than a risk of Vioxx, and the drug was approved.

In 2005, the results of a randomized, placebo-controlled study showed that Vioxx users suffered a higher rate of heart attacks and other cardiovascular disorders than patients taking no medication at all. The manufacturer, Merck, withdrew the drug after disclosures that it had withheld information about its risks from doctors and patients for over five years, resulting in between 88,000 and 140,000 cases of serious heart disease of which roughly half died.

==== Conflicts of interest and pressure on FDA scientists ====
David Graham, a scientist in the Office of Drug Safety within the CDER, testified to Congress that he was pressured by his supervisors not to warn the public about dangers of drugs like Vioxx. He argued that an inherent conflict of interest exists when the office responsible for post-approval monitoring of drug safety is controlled by the same organization which initially approved those same drugs as safe and effective. He said that after testifying against Vioxx, he was "marginalized by FDA management and not asked to participate in the evaluation of any new drug safety issues. It's a type of ostracism." In a 2006 survey sponsored by the Union of Concerned Scientists, almost one-fifth of FDA scientists said they "have been asked, for non-scientific reasons, to inappropriately exclude or alter technical information or their conclusions in an FDA scientific document."

=== Allegations that unsafe food additives and processing technologies are approved ===
==== Inadequate long-term safety testing for additives ====
Critics argue that the FDA's food additive safety testing, guided by Redbook 2000, relies heavily on short-term (14–28 days) and subchronic (90 days) studies for most additives, with chronic (≥12 months) or carcinogenicity (18–24 months) testing reserved for high-concern substances or suspected carcinogens. This tiered approach, particularly for Generally Recognized as Safe (GRAS) substances, often lacks long-term toxicology data to assess chronic health effects like endocrine disruption or obesity, which may develop over decades. Public health experts link these gaps to the U.S. obesity epidemic (affecting ~42% of adults as of 2025), citing additives like emulsifiers and sweeteners as potential obesogens that alter metabolism or appetite in ways undetected by short-term tests. The FDA maintains that its guidelines ensure safety for intended uses, but critics call for mandatory chronic testing and cumulative exposure assessments to address rising chronic diseases.

==== GRAS self-affirmation loophole ====
Critics of the FDA's GRAS program highlight the self-affirmation pathway loophole, allowing companies to declare new food and beverage ingredients "generally recognized as safe" without notifying FDA or submitting data. Originating in a 1997 rule, this enables undetected market entry of thousands of substances, undermining oversight and transparency and raising consumer safety concerns. A 2010 GAO report noted the FDA's inability to track these, estimating over 1,000 undisclosed ingredients. In March 2025, HHS Secretary Robert F. Kennedy Jr. directed mandatory notifications to close this gap. Groups like Americans for Ingredient Transparency (AFIT), launched in October 2025, advocate for a national disclosure standard.

==== Carbon monoxide in meat packaging ====
Food safety advocates have criticized the FDA for allowing meat manufacturers to use carbon monoxide gas mixtures during the packaging process to prevent discoloration of meat, a process that may hide signs of spoilage from the consumer.

==== Recombinant bovine growth hormone (rBGH) in dairy ====
The FDA has been criticised for allowing the use of recombinant bovine growth hormone (rBGH) in dairy cows. rBGH-treated cows secrete higher levels of insulin-like growth factor 1 (IGF-1) in their milk than do untreated cows. IGF-1 signalling is thought to play a role in sustaining the growth of some tumors, although there is little or no evidence that exogenously absorbed IGF could promote tumor growth. The FDA approved rBGH for use in dairy cows in 1993, after concluding that humans drinking such milk were unlikely to absorb biologically significant quantities of bovine IGF-1. A 1999 report of the European Commission Scientific Committee on Veterinary Measures relating to Public Health noted that scientific questions persist regarding the theoretical health risks of milk from rBGH-treated cows, particularly for feeding to infants. Since 1993, all EU countries have maintained a ban on rBGH use in dairy cattle.

==== Antibiotic use in livestock ====
The FDA has also been criticised for permitting the routine use of antibiotics in healthy domestic animals to promote their growth, a practice which allegedly contributes to the evolution of antibiotic-resistant strains of bacteria. The FDA has taken recent steps to limit the use of antibiotics in farm animals. In September 2005, the FDA withdrew approval for the use of the fluoroquinolone antibiotic enrofloxacin (trade name Baytril) in poultry, out of concern that this practice could promote bacterial resistance to important human antibiotics such as ciprofloxacin.

==== Coal tar-derived food dyes ====
The FDA has received criticism for its approval of certain coal tar derived food dyes such as FDC yellow 5 and 6, which are banned in most European countries. On September 6, 2007, the British Food Standards Agency revised advice on certain artificial food additives, including tartrazine.

Professor Jim Stevenson from Southampton University and author of the report said: "This has been a major study investigating an important area of research. The results suggest that consumption of certain mixtures of artificial food colours and sodium benzoate preservative are associated with increases in hyperactive behaviour in children.

The following additives were tested in the research:

- Sunset yellow (FD&C Yellow #6) – Reddish-yellow coloring used in many foods and cosmetics
- Carmoisine – Red coloring used in jellies
- Tartrazine (FD&C Yellow #5) – Yellow coloring
- Ponceau 4R – Red coloring
- Sodium benzoate – Preservative
- Quinoline yellow – Food coloring
- Allura red AC (FD&C Red #40) – Orange / red food dye

On April 10, 2008, the Food Standards Agency called for a voluntary removal of the colors (but not sodium benzoate) by 2009. In addition, it recommended that there should be action to phase them out in food and drink in the European Union (EU) over a specified period.

UK ministers have agreed that the six colorings will be phased out by 2009. A Japanese group found in 1987 that tartrazine was not carcinogenic after being fed to mice for two years. A German group found in 1989 that Sunset Yellow did not induce mutations that could lead to cancer in laboratory animals.

==== Cloned animal products ====
The FDA has also been criticized for giving permission for cloned animals to be sold as food without any special labeling, although "cloned products may not reach the U.S. market for years." and "Authorities lack the authority to require labeling of products from cloned animals."

==== Limited toxicology data for additives ====
In August 2013, a study released by The Pew Charitable Trusts found that of the 8105 additives that the FDA allows in food only 19% (1367) have toxicology information.

== Charges of FDA bias ==
=== Allegations of undue pharmaceutical industry influence ===
==== Pressure from pharmaceutical industry and lobbyists ====
After his resignation, from his post as Commissioner of the Food and Drugs Administration in December 1969, Dr. Herbert L. Ley, Jr. In an interview to The New York Times, warned the public about the FDA's inability to safeguard consumers. People were being misled, he believed "The thing that bugs me is that the people think the FDA is protecting them - it isn't. What the FDA is doing and what the public thinks it's doing are as different as night and day," he said. The agency, in his opinion, did not have the motivation to protect consumers, faced budget shortfalls, and lacked support from the Department of Health, Education, and Welfare. Dr. Ley was critical of Congress, the Administration and the drug industry, stating that he had "constant, tremendous, sometimes unmerciful pressure" from the drug industry, and that the drug company lobbyists, combined with the politicians who worked on behalf of their patrons, could bring "tremendous pressure" to bear on him and his staff, to try preventing FDA restrictions on their drugs. Ley stated that the entire issue was about money, "pure and simple". On December 15, 1999, interviewed for the oral history program of the FDA History Office, Dr. Ley shared that from the first controversy in his tenure as FDA Commissioner he had a "gut feeling" that his life expectancy at the FDA was probably limited. He said he had done everything by the book, both in the FDA and the Department of Health, Education, and Welfare, and he thinks that what the Administration was really wishing, was that he would stonewall the whole Academy report because it was goring too many pharmaceutical companies.

==== Financial ties and perceived industry bias ====
In a 2005 interview, Dr. David Graham, associate director of the FDA's Office of Drug Safety, stated that "FDA is inherently biased in favor of the pharmaceutical industry. It views industry as its client, whose interests it must represent and advance. It views its primary mission as approving as many drugs it can, regardless of whether the drugs are safe or needed"

The Prescription Drug User Fee Act allows the FDA to augment its budget by charging fees to pharmaceutical firms. Over $800 million was collected from 1993 to 2001 and rising each year. It also has been shown that oftentimes, the FDA expert advisory panels had direct financial interests in the drugs or products being evaluated. Former Editor of The New England Journal of Medicine, Marcia Angell, has stated that "It's time to take the Food and Drug Administration back from the drug companies.... In effect, the user fee act put the FDA on the payroll of the industry it regulates. Last year, the fees came to about $300 million, which the companies recoup many times over by getting their drugs to market faster." Critics have disputed the claim that the Prescription Drug User Fee Amendment has improved the speed of drug approvals.

On April 14, 2017, House and Senate leaders announced a bipartisan agreement to extend the FDA's ability to collect high user fees from drug companies and medical device manufacturers. This allows the FDA to charge huge licensing fees to drug manufacturers, which has led to enormous increases in generic drug pricing. In 2013 and 2014, generic drug pricing for over 200 drugs increased over 100%. Many of those drugs had price hikes over 1000%. It has been reported that 75% of the FDA generic drug oversight budget comes directly from private drug companies.

==== Favoritism toward costlier drugs ====
A historical example of how the FDA seemingly favors the pharmaceutical industry either from clandestine direct money payments to FDA directors and scientific advisers or other undisclosed or unknown means was seen with the generic drug droperidol. Droperidol was a widely used antiemetic used perioperatively safely for over 30 years. During that time there had never been a case reported in peer-reviewed medical literature of cardiac arrhythmias or cardiac issues when given at doses typically used for post-operative nausea and vomiting. Nonetheless, and without warning, in 2001 the FDA issued a black box warning regarding QTc prolongation (a dangerous finding on an ECG which can lead to cardiac arrest) with the use of droperidol. This effectively killed the common use of droperidol and made way for heavy usage of the much more expensive non-generic 5-HT3 serotonin receptor antagonists on the market even though these newer drugs had also been shown to prolong QTc as much, if not more than droperidol. In addition, each of the 5-HT3 antagonists available at that time had peer-reviewed reports of causing significant cardiac abnormalities, and in some cases, death.

Despite an apparent discrepancy that deeply concerned the anesthesia and emergency room physician community, the FDA persisted in keeping the black box warning, while at the same time did not place any restrictions on the more expensive 5-HT3 antagonists. However, D2 antagonists like droperidol are occasionally prone to acute cognitive impairment and sedation at antiemetic doses. It can be said that 5-HT3 antagonists are superior to droperidol in this regard, which was one reason why droperidol fell out of favor after the advent of 5-HT3 antagonists.

=== Allegations of bias against gay men in blood donation process ===
==== Blanket ban on MSM blood donations ====
Blood collecting organizations, such as the American Red Cross, have policies in accordance with FDA guidelines that prohibit accepting blood donations from any "male who has had sex with another male since 1977, even once". The inclusion of homo- and bisexual men on the prohibited list has created some controversy, but the FDA and Red Cross cite the need to protect blood recipients from HIV as justification for the continued ban. Even with PCR-based testing of blood products, a "window period" may still exist in which an HIV-positive unit of blood would test negative. All potential donors from HIV high-risk groups are deferred for this reason, including men who have sex with men. The issue has been periodically revisited by the Blood Products Advisory Committee within the FDA Center for Biologics Evaluation and Research and was last reconfirmed on May 24, 2007. Documentation from these meetings is available to the public.

==== Opposition to blanket ban and calls for policy change ====
However, in 2006, the AABB, America's Blood Centers and American Red Cross recommended to the FDA that the deferral period for men who had sex with other men should be changed to be equivalent with the deferral period for heterosexual's judged to be at risk. The FDA chose to uphold the blood ban. Female sexual partners of MSM (men who have sex with men) are deferred for one year since the last exposure. This is the same policy used for any sexual partner of someone in a high-risk group. The intent of these policies is to ensure that blood is collected from a population that is at low risk for disease, since the tests are not perfect and human error may lead to infected units not being properly discarded. The policy was first put in place in 1985.

==== Evolving MSM blood donation policies ====
In 2015, gay and bi men were allowed to donate blood after a one-year deferred period. In 2020 during the COVID-19 pandemic, the deferred period was lowered to 3 months. In May 2023, gay and bi men can finally donate blood immediately "on the condition of being monogamous or just having one partner" regardless of sexual activity. Any non-monogamous individuals (regardless of sexual orientation) who have anal sex are automatically deferred to 3 months - Canada and the UK has implemented the same blood donation policy. It will take a while to be fully implemented, due to the American Red Cross donation centers and hospital computer systems and data needing to be upgraded with the new information.

=== Allegations of bias in FDA's medical cannabis policy ===
In April 2005, the FDA issued a statement asserting that cannabis had no medical value and should not be accepted as a medicine, despite a great deal of research suggesting the opposite. The supporters of medical cannabis legalization criticized the FDA's statement as a politically motivated one instead of one based on solid science. A group of congressmen led by Maurice Hinchey wrote a letter to FDA's commissioner Andrew von Eschenbach, expressing their disapproval of the FDA's statement and pointed out the FDA's rejection of medical cannabis was inconsistent with the findings of the Institute of Medicine, which stated cannabis does have medical benefits. While the FDA has not approved marijuana as a medicine, it has approved cannabis-derived compounds, including synthetic THC (e.g., Marinol) and CBD (e.g., Epidiolex) for specific medical uses. Critics argue that this approval is a politically motivated attempt to allow special interest groups to hold patents over cannabis-derived substances, particularly as patents on other competing drugs have expired. The FDA maintains that its approval of cannabis-derived medications is based on evidence from controlled clinical trials, consistent with its standard drug approval process, and does not extend to whole-plant cannabis due to insufficient data on its safety and efficacy. The debate persists, with the U.S. Department of Health and Human Services recommending in 2023 that cannabis be rescheduled to acknowledge potential medical benefits, though the FDA's position on whole-plant cannabis remains unchanged as of 2025.

=== Allegations regarding management and FDA scientists ===
Nine FDA scientists appealed to President George W. Bush and at the time, President-elect Barack Obama over pressure from management to manipulate data, mainly in relation to the review process for medical devices. These concerns were highlighted in a 2006 report on the agency as well.

Monsanto-case: Mrs. Miller from Monsanto applies at FDA for product safety, changes her job to FDA and confirms her own safety application as FDA manager. 5th GcMAF Conference - 2017 Moscow - Speaker: Scott Tipps - National Health Federation

== Abolitionism ==
Libertarians such as American television personality John Stossel and editor-in-chief of Reason Katherine Mangu-Ward have advocated in favor of abolishing the FDA.

== See also ==
- Criticism of the United States government#Criticism of agencies
- Pharmaceutical industry
