= Robert I. Misbin =

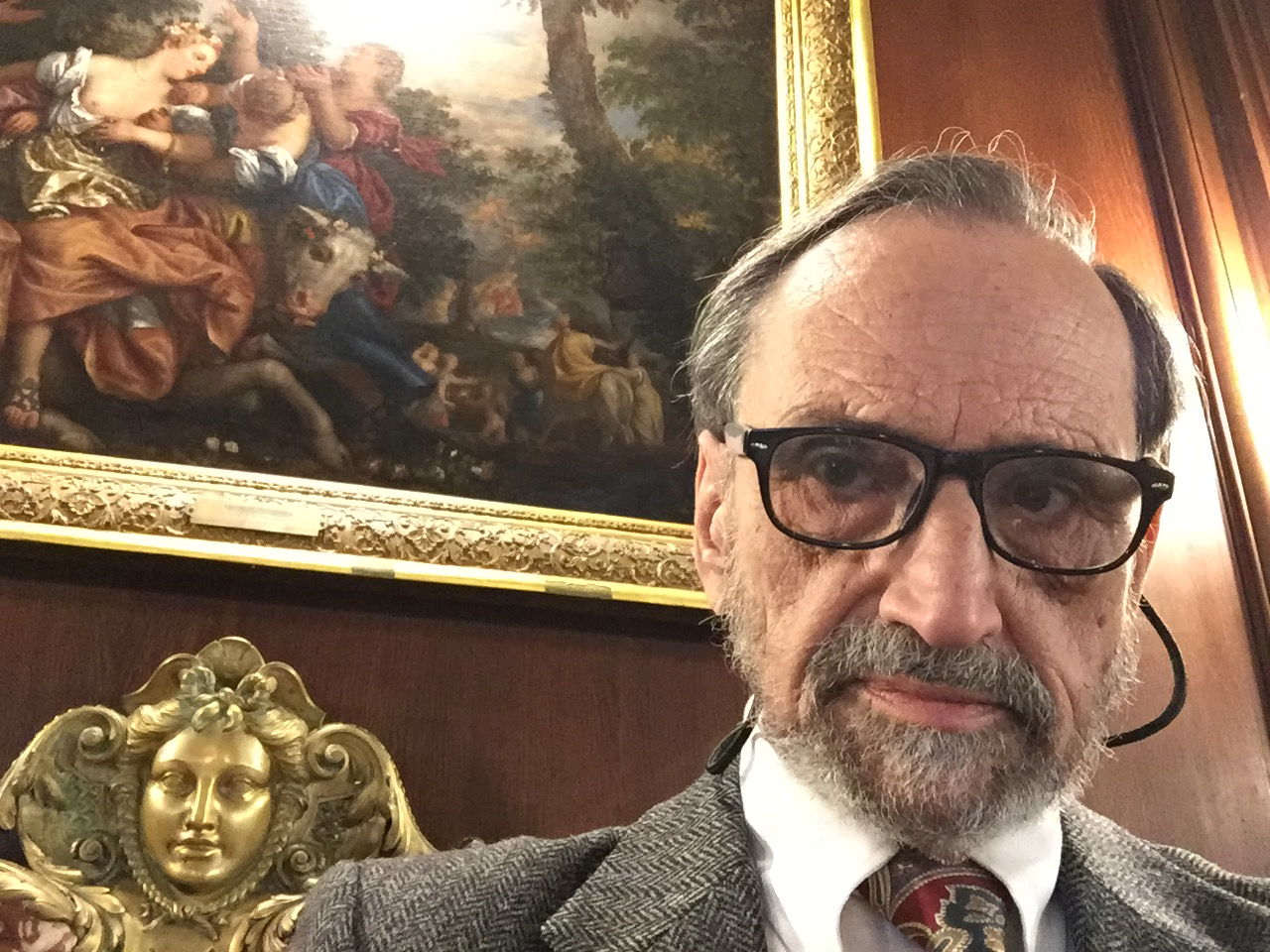
- Robert I. Misbin, 2022
- Born: March 20, 1947 (age 79); Brooklyn
- Occupation: physician

Robert I. Misbin is an American physician and author. Throughout his career in the Food and Drug Administration, he was an advocate for safer drugs to be developed in a way that did not exploit patient volunteers.

== Early life and career ==
Robert (Bob) Misbin was born in Brooklyn March 20, 1947. He graduated from Brooklyn College and Johns Hopkins School of Medicine. While at the University of Florida he studied the relationship between insulin and the liver using intrinsically labeled tritiated insulin that he synthesized using tissue he isolated from rat pancreas. He has written several articles and books about diabetes and medical ethics. Frequently quoted is his work on lactic acidosis, a rare but fatal complication of the popular diabetes drug metformin.

In 1995, Dr. Misbin joined the Food and Drug Administration (FDA) and was the principal medical officer for insulin analogs and other drugs to treat diabetes. His letter to The Washington Post demanding higher standards for approval of new drugs made him unpopular with his superiors. His letter to U. S. Senator John Ashcroft led to the removal of the diabetes drug Rezulin (troglitazone) after dozens of cases of liver failure had been reported without definitive action by the FDA. The series of articles about Rezulin by David Wilman in the Los Angeles Times won the 2001 Pulitzer Prize for Investigative Reporting. Later, Dr. Misbin cautioned that the diabetes drug Avandia (rosiglitazone) might paradoxically increase cardiovascular disease instead of decreasing it and recommended a safety trial to evaluate this risk. At a Congressional hearing June 6, 2007, Representative Henry Waxman quoted Dr. Misbin's April 1999 review: "The increase in body weight and undesirable effects on serum lipids is cause for concern… It cannot be assumed that treatment with rosiglitazone will decrease the risk of heart disease," and asked FDA commissioner Andrew von Eschenbach why the agency did not take seriously the concerns expressed by Dr. Misbin. The failures of the FDA in the approval of Avandia were the subject of an exposé in Time magazine. The FDA also disregarded Dr. Misbin's 2006 recommendation to add the risk of bladder cancer to the label of the diabetes drug Actos (pioglitazone). Conspiracy to conceal the risk of bladder cancer by the drug's manufacturers, Takeda and Eli Lilly, is the subject of a legal action, based in part on Dr. Misbin's testimony (Supreme Court of the United States, docket 25-625). In March 2026, the Supreme Court cleared the way for the lawsuit to proceed. Finally, Dr. Misbin bucked his superiors after the approval of the diabetes drug Symlin despite reports of automobile accidents brought on by the lower blood sugar caused by use of this drug with insulin. But Dr. Misbin's judgment about Symlin has been the subject of criticism. As of the year 2026, Symlin is still marketed in the US but has not been approved elsewhere.

Dr Misbin left the FDA in September 2010 after having called upon the agency to change how it approves new drugs to treat diabetes. In 2019, journalist Sharyl Attkisson reported Misbin's advice to patients with diabetes about how to avoid the high cost of insulin analogs.

In addition to diabetes, Dr. Misbin has an interest in medical ethics. He was especially critical of how the FDA allowed drug companies to withhold active treatment from patients to make patients eligible to enroll in drug trials in which many would only get a placebo. He is especially interested in terminal care issues and was a consultant to the Virginia legislature when it considered medical aid in dying in 2018.

== Musical contributions ==
In retirement, Dr. Misbin has pursued his lifelong love of opera and classical music. He brought together the Levine School of Music and the Washington Performing Arts Society to develop a chamber music competition for greater Washington. Through his alma mater at Johns Hopkins University, he developed a program to educate children in inner city Baltimore on how to play string instruments. He was a cofounder of Partners for the Arts and helped develop the “Ambassador Ensemble" of the Chicago Metamorphosis Orchestra Project. His noncommercial website ClassicalWashington.com promotes concerts in greater Washington. Inspired by Thomas Mann's novella Mario and the Magician about the rise of fascism under Benito Mussolini, Dr. Misbin wrote the libretto for Briscula the Magician, an opera that had four performances in Rockville, Maryland, in March 2020. He also composed music in the style of New Orleans jazz to a section of Briscula. This piece was performed at the Arts Club of Washington DC on February 11, 2023.

The manuscript for a previously unknown waltz by Chopin was discovered in October 2024. Dr. Misbin commissioned Sam Post to expand this atypically short waltz into a seven-minute piece in the style of a Chopin scherzo with syncopated rhythms. This new piece, "Waltz Scherzo After Chopin", was premiered by Chris Schmitt of the Classical Arts Society of Washington in March 2026 at the Arts Club of Washington DC.
