= C18H23NO3S =

The molecular formula C_{18}H_{23}NO_{3}S (molar mass: 333.45 g/mol) may refer to:

- Ciglitazone
- 2C-T-33
