= David Graham (epidemiologist) =

American epidemiologist

David J. Graham is an American epidemiologist who is the Associate Director of the Food and Drug Administration's Office of Drug Safety.

Graham has spent his career at the FDA studying the safety of drugs, many of them after approval using data from medical insurance companies. He claims successes in removing from the U.S. market the unsafe drugs Omniflox an antibiotic, Rezulin, a diabetes treatment, Fen-Phen and Redux, weight-loss drugs, and phenylpropanolamine, an over-the-counter decongestant, and in restricting the use of Trovan, an antibiotic, to use in hospitals. He also had a part in the removal of Lotronex, Baycol, Seldane, and Propulsid.

On November 18, 2004, Dr. Graham testified before the U.S. Senate Committee on Finance about Merck's withdrawal of the popular anti-inflammatory drug Vioxx the previous month because of serious safety concerns. In his testimony, he asserted his personal belief that the policies within the U.S. Food and Drug Administration were insufficient to protect the public from drugs which carry unacceptable risks, saying "I would argue that the FDA, as currently configured, is incapable of protecting America against another Vioxx. We are virtually defenseless."

After his testimony, Graham was publicly criticized by the FDA. He contacted the nonprofit Government Accountability Project, a whistleblower protection organization, for advice on getting his findings on Vioxx published over the objections of his superiors.

In a 2005 interview, Dr. Graham was asked "What Specifically do you believe is broken in the FDA and what needs to be done to fix it? What must be done to improve the drug vetting system ?" his response: " FDA is inherently biased in favor of the pharmaceutical industry. It views industry as its client, whose interests it must represent and advance. It views its primary mission as approving as many drugs it can, regardless of whether the drugs are safe or needed"

In 2010, Graham and one of his FDA colleagues, Kate Gelperin, have called for the popular diabetes drug Avandia to be pulled from the market. Their study of the drug found possible evidence of an increased incidence of mortality; however, they found no indication of an increased risk of heart attack, contrary to other published studies.
