= Netoglitazone =

Chemical compound

Clinical data
- ATC code: None

Identifiers
- IUPAC name: 5-[(6-[(2-Fluorophenyl)methoxy]naphthalen-2-yl)methyl]-1,3-thiazolidine-2,4-dione
- CAS Number: 161600-01-7
- PubChem CID: 204109
- IUPHAR/BPS: 2707
- DrugBank: DB09199
- ChemSpider: 176806
- UNII: QOV2JZ647A
- KEGG: D05150
- CompTox Dashboard (EPA): DTXSID5043712
- ECHA InfoCard: 100.233.314

Chemical and physical data
- Formula: C_{21}H_{16}FNO_{3}S
- Molar mass: 381.42 g·mol^{−1}
- 3D model (JSmol): Interactive image
- SMILES: C1=CC=C(C(=C1)COC2=CC3=C(C=C2)C=C(C=C3)CC4C(=O)NC(=O)S4)F
- InChI: InChI=1S/C21H16FNO3S/c22-18-4-2-1-3-16(18)12-26-17-8-7-14-9-13(5-6-15(14)11-17)10-19-20(24)23-21(25)27-19/h1-9,11,19H,10,12H2,(H,23,24,25); Key:PKWDZWYVIHVNKS-UHFFFAOYSA-N

Netoglitazone (also called MCC-555) is a hypoglycemic agent belonging to the thiazolidinedione group. Netoglitazone is more than 50 times more powerful in decreasing blood glucose levels in type two diabetes than rosiglitazone, but is ten times less potent that rosiglitazone in adipogenesis. It is not used medically.
