= Leriglitazone =

Chemical compound

Clinical data
- Trade names: Nezglyal
- Other names: Hydroxypioglitazone
- Routes of administration: By mouth
- ATC code: A16AX23 (WHO)

Legal status
- Legal status: EU: Rx-only

Identifiers
- IUPAC name: 5-[[4-[2-[5-(1-Hydroxyethyl)pyridin-2-yl]ethoxy]phenyl]methyl]-1,3-thiazolidine-2,4-dione
- CAS Number: 146062-44-4
- PubChem CID: 4147757
- DrugBank: DB15021
- ChemSpider: 3360070
- UNII: K824X25AYA
- KEGG: D11603
- ChEMBL: ChEMBL1267
- CompTox Dashboard (EPA): DTXSID30399914

Chemical and physical data
- Formula: C_{19}H_{20}N_{2}O_{4}S
- Molar mass: 372.44 g·mol^{−1}
- 3D model (JSmol): Interactive image
- SMILES: CC(C1=CN=C(C=C1)CCOC2=CC=C(C=C2)CC3C(=O)NC(=O)S3)O
- InChI: InChI=1S/C19H20N2O4S/c1-12(22)14-4-5-15(20-11-14)8-9-25-16-6-2-13(3-7-16)10-17-18(23)21-19(24)26-17/h2-7,11-12,17,22H,8-10H2,1H3,(H,21,23,24); Key:OXVFDZYQLGRLCD-UHFFFAOYSA-N

Leriglitazone. sold under the brand name Nezglyal, is used to treat used to treat cerebral adrenoleukodystrophy. It is a PPAR-gamma agonist and metabolite of the glitazone pioglitazone. It is an active metabolite of pioglitazone, and a selective peroxisome proliferator-activated receptor gamma (PPARγ) agonist that crosses the blood-brain barrier (BBB). Lerigltazone has been reported to have an antioxidant and neuroprotective activity in the central nervous system by modulating critical pathways involved in cerebral adrenoleukodystrophy progression and consequently decreasing neuroinflammation, enhancing BBB integrity, promoting myelination and improving mitochondrial function. It is taken by mouth.

The most common side effects in children include weight increase, eyelid edema, leukopenia, and neutropenia.

== Medical uses ==
Leriglitazone is indicated for the treatment of cerebral adrenoleukodystrophy in males with adrenoleukodystrophy aged 2 years of age to 12 years of age with non-gadolinium enhancing lesions (i.e. Gd negative) in brain magnetic resonance imaging, with a neurological functional score of 0 or 1.

== History ==
The benefits of leriglitazone were shown in an open-label study which measured the effects of leriglitazoneon disease progression prior to hematopoietic stem cell transplantation, in boys aged 2 years of age to 12 years of age with cerebral adrenoleukodystrophy.

== Society and culture ==
=== Legal status ===
In January 2024, the European Medicines Agency (EMA) recommended the refusal of the marketing authorization for leriglitazone (Nezglyal) requested by Minoryx Therapeutics S.L. In May 2024, the EMA confirmed its recommendation to refuse marketing authorization for leriglitazone.

In July 2026, the Committee for Medicinal Products for Human Use of the EMA adopted a positive opinion recommending the granting of a marketing authorization under exceptional circumstances for the medicinal product Nezglyal, intended for the treatment of cerebral adrenoleukodystrophy. The applicant for this medicinal product is Minoryx Therapeutics. The European Commission granted leriglitazone an orphan drug designation. Leriglitazone was authorized for medical use in the European Union in September 2026.
