= Thiazolidinedione =

Class of chemical compounds

Functional group

The thiazolidinediones /θaɪ.əˌzoʊlɪdiːnˈdaɪ.oʊn/, abbreviated as TZD, also known as glitazones after the prototypical drug ciglitazone, are a class of heterocyclic compounds consisting of a five-membered C_{3}NS ring. The term usually refers to a family of drugs used in the treatment of diabetes mellitus type 2 that were introduced in the late 1990s. As of 2024, there are two FDA-approved drugs in this class, pioglitazone and rosiglitazone.

== Mechanism of action ==
Thiazolidinediones or TZDs act by activating PPARs (peroxisome proliferator-activated receptors), a group of nuclear receptors, specific for PPARγ (PPAR-gamma, PPARG). They are thus the PPARG agonists subset of PPAR agonists. The endogenous ligands for these receptors are free fatty acids (FFAs) and eicosanoids. When activated, the receptor binds to DNA in complex with the retinoid X receptor (RXR), another nuclear receptor, increasing transcription of a number of specific genes and decreasing transcription of others. The main effect of expression and repression of specific genes is an increase in the storage of fatty acids in adipocytes, thereby decreasing the amount of fatty acids present in circulation. As a result, cells become more dependent on the oxidation of carbohydrates, more specifically glucose, in order to yield energy for other cellular processes.

=== PPARγ transactivation ===
Thiazolidinedione ligand dependent transactivation is responsible for the majority of anti-diabetic effects.

The activated PPAR/RXR heterodimer binds to peroxisome proliferator hormone response elements upstream of target genes in complex with a number of coactivators such as nuclear receptor coactivator 1 and CREB binding protein, this causes upregulation of genes (for a full list see PPARγ):

- Insulin resistance is decreased
- Adipocyte differentiation is modified
- VEGF-induced angiogenesis is inhibited
- Leptin levels decrease (leading to an increased appetite)
- Levels of certain interleukins (e.g. IL-6) fall
- Antiproliferative action
- Adiponectin levels rise

TZDs also increase the synthesis of certain proteins involved in fat and glucose metabolism, which reduces levels of certain types of lipids, and circulating free fatty acids. TZDs generally decrease triglycerides and increase high-density lipoprotein cholesterol (HDL-C) and low-density lipoprotein cholesterol (LDL-C). Although the increase in LDL-C may be more focused on the larger LDL particles, which may be less atherogenic, the clinical significance of this is currently unknown. Nonetheless, rosiglitazone, a certain glitazone, was suspended from allowed use by medical authorities in Europe, as it has been linked to an increased risk of heart attack and stroke.

=== PPARγ transrepression ===
Thiazolidinedione ligand dependent transrepression mediates the majority of anti-inflammatory effects.

Binding of PPARγ to coactivators appears to reduce the levels of coactivators available for binding to pro-inflammatory transcription factors such as NF-κB; this causes a decrease in transcription of a number of pro inflammatory genes, including various interleukins and tumour necrosis factors.

== Members of the class ==
The chemical structure of thiazolidinedione and rhodanine

Chemically, the members of this class are derivatives of the parent compound thiazolidinedione, and include:

- Pioglitazone (Actos), France and Germany have suspended its sale after a study suggested the drug could raise the risk of bladder cancer.
- Rosiglitazone (Avandia), which was put under selling restrictions in the US and withdrawn from the market in Europe due to some studies suggesting an increased risk of cardiovascular events. Upon re-evaluation of new data in 2013, the FDA lifted the restrictions.
- Lobeglitazone (Duvie), approved for use in South Korea

Experimental, failed and non-marketed agents include:

- Azemiglitazone
- Ciglitazone
- Darglitazone
- Englitazone
- Netoglitazone
- Rivoglitazone
- Troglitazone (Rezulin), withdrawn due to increased incidence of drug-induced hepatitis.
- Balaglitazone (DRF-2593) – developed by Dr Reddy's Laboratories, discontinued during 2010-11 phase III trials as no better than available molecules.
- AS-605240 [648450-29-7]
- Leriglitazone: metabolite of pioglitazone

Replacing one oxygen atom in a thiazolidinedione with an atom of sulfur gives a rhodanine.

== Uses ==
The only approved use of the thiazolidinediones is in diabetes mellitus type 2. According to a 2014 Cochrane systematic review of four randomized controlled trials, PPARγ-agonists may be effective in preventing further strokes in those who have already had a stroke or a transient ischemic attack (TIA) and may stabilize atherosclerotic plaques in the carotid arteries.

== Research ==
Several forms of lipodystrophy cause insulin resistance, which has responded favorably to thiazolidinediones. There are some indications that thiazolidinediones provide some degree of protection against the initial stages of breast carcinoma development.

Evidence was emerging in 2008 that vitamin E with thiazolidinediones is effective in the treatment of non-alcoholic steatohepatitis due to their combined antioxidant and insulin sensitizing effects, producing histological improvements in steatosis severity.

Thiazolindinediones induce adipogenesis in subcutaneous fat deposits by activating PPARγ receptors. This effect has been used in transgender patients to shift body fat distribution towards a more gynoid pattern.

== Side effects and contraindications ==
The withdrawal of troglitazone has led to concerns of the other thiazolidinediones also increasing the incidence of hepatitis and potential liver failure, an approximately 1 in 20,000 individual occurrence with troglitazone. Because of this, the FDA recommends two to three month checks of liver enzymes for the first year of thiazolidinedione therapy to check for this rare but potentially catastrophic complication. To date, 2008, the newer thiazolidinediones, rosiglitazone and pioglitazone have been free of this problem.

The main side effect of all thiazolidinediones is water retention, leading to edema, generally a problem in less than 5% of individuals, but a big problem for some and potentially, with significant water retention, leading to a decompensation of potentially previously unrecognized heart failure. Therefore, thiazolidinediones should be prescribed with both caution and patient warnings about the potential for water retention/weight gain, especially in patients with decreased ventricular function (NYHA grade III or IV heart failure).

Though older studies suggested there may be an increased risk of coronary heart disease and heart attacks with rosiglitazone, pioglitazone treatment, in contrast, has shown significant protection from both micro- and macro-vascular cardiovascular events and plaque progression. These studies led to a period of Food and Drug Administration advisories (2007 – 2013) that, aided by extensive media coverage, led to a substantial decrease in rosiglitazone use. In November 2013, the FDA announced it would remove the usage restrictions for rosiglitazone in patients with coronary artery disease. The new recommendations were largely based on the reasoning that prior meta-analyses leading to the original restrictions were not designed to assess cardiac outcomes and, thus, not uniformly collected or adjudicated. In contrast, one of the largest trials (RECORD trial) that was specifically designed to assess cardiac outcomes found no increased risk of myocardial infarction with rosiglitazone use, even after independent re-evaluation for FDA review.

A 2013 meta-analysis concluded that use of pioglitazone is associated with a slightly higher risk of bladder cancer compared to the general population. The authors of the same analysis recommended that other blood sugar lowering agents be considered in people with other risk factors for bladder cancer such as cigarette smoking, family history, or exposure to certain forms of chemotherapy.

A 2020 Cochrane systematic review did not find enough evidence of reduction of all-cause mortality, serious adverse events, cardiovascular mortality, non-fatal myocardial infarction, non-fatal stroke or end-stage renal disease when comparing metformin monotherapy to Thiazolidinedione for treatment of type 2 diabetes.

Thiazolidinediones reduce bone mineral density and increase the risk of fractures in women, possibly as a result of biasing the differentiation of bone marrow stromal cells away from osteoblast differentiation and toward adipocyte formation.
