= Black box warning =

Type of warning that appears on the package insert for certain prescription drugs

An exemplary boxed warning, as seen in context, in FDA's Challenges and Issues with Safety-Related Information in the Prescribing Information slide deck. For emphasis, the text is bolded and surrounded by a black outline.

In the United States, a boxed warning (sometimes "black box warning", colloquially) is a type of warning that appears near the beginning of the package insert for certain prescription drugs, so called because the U.S. Food and Drug Administration specifies that it is formatted with a "box" or border around the text to emphasize its importance. The FDA can require a pharmaceutical company to place a boxed warning. It is the strongest warning that the FDA requires, and signifies that medical studies indicate that the drug carries a significant risk of preventable, serious or even life-threatening adverse effects.

Economists and physicians have thoroughly studied the effects of FDA boxed warnings on prescription patterns. It is not necessarily true that a physician and patient will have a conversation about a drug's boxed warning after it is issued. For instance, an FDA-mandated boxed warning decreased rosiglitazone use by 70%, but that still meant 3.8 million people were given the drug. Later research indicated that after receiving an FDA advisory, there was a decrease in rosiglitazone use, due to a combined effect of media exposure, advisory, and scientific publications, whereas pioglitazone (with a similar advisory but less media exposure) did not similarly decrease in use.

== Examples ==
Boxed warnings on drugs have received increased media attention in the United States since 2004. Among some of the more widely covered stories:

- In October 2004, the FDA began requiring that boxed warnings be placed on all antidepressant medications, warning they may result in an increased risk of suicidal tendencies in children and adolescents. In May 2006, the boxed warning was expanded to young adults aged 18–24 years old.
- As of November 17, 2004, the FDA has required a boxed warning on the Depo-Provera contraceptive injection, due to the risk of significant loss of bone density with long-term use.
- In April 2005, FDA advisors requested that Pfizer place a boxed warning on their non-steroidal anti-inflammatory drug Celebrex (celecoxib) for cardiovascular and gastrointestinal risks.
- In 2005, the FDA issued a boxed warning regarding the risk of atypical antipsychotics being prescribed among elderly patients with dementia. This advisory was associated with a decrease in use of antipsychotics, especially in elderly patients with dementia.
- As of 2006, natalizumab (marketed as Tysabri) received a boxed warning on its packaging due to increased risk of developing progressive multifocal leukoencephalopathy (PML). Tysabri was pulled from the market in 2004, shortly after its introduction, after three cases of the rare disease were linked to its use. PML has affected approximately 212 Natalizumab recipients in 2012 (or 2.1 in every 1000 patients). Tysabri is now distributed under a controlled prescription program called TOUCH (Tysabri Outreach: Unified Commitment to Health).
- As of October 9, 2006, the FDA added a boxed warning to the anticoagulant warfarin due to the risk of bleeding to death.
- In February 2006, the FDA's Drug Safety and Risk Management Advisory Committee voted to include boxed warnings on methylphenidate formulations used to treat attention deficit hyperactivity disorder, such as Ritalin (methylphenidate), due to possible cardiovascular side-effects. A month later, the agency's Pediatric Advisory Committee effectively rejected recommending boxed warnings for both cardiovascular and psychiatric adverse effects.
- On November 14, 2007, the FDA added a boxed warning to the diabetes medication Avandia (rosiglitazone), citing the risk of heart failure or heart attack to patients with underlying heart disease, or are at a high heart attack risk.
- On July 8, 2008, the FDA ordered a boxed warning on certain antibiotic medications containing fluoroquinolone, which has been linked to tendon ruptures and tendinitis. Included were the popular drugs Cipro (ciprofloxacin), Levaquin (levofloxacin), Avelox (moxifloxacin), Noroxin (norfloxacin) and Floxin (ofloxacin).
- On July 1, 2009, the FDA required Chantix (varenicline) to carry a boxed warning due to public reports of side effects including depression, suicidal thoughts, and suicidal actions. As of 2016, the warning has been removed on the basis of updated evidence.
- On October 27, 2010, the FDA issued a boxed warning regarding the use of Metacam (meloxicam) oral suspension in cats in the United States. Meloxicam is a non-steroidal anti-inflammatory drug that is approved in the U.S. for a single post-operative injection in cats.
- As of May 2013, the FDA issued a boxed warning regarding the use of thyroid hormone stimulating agents in treatment of obesity. Data does not indicate any benefits to using these agents for weight loss. Data does indicate an increased risk of life-threatening cardiovascular events when high levels of these agents are used in hypothyroid populations. Euthyroid populations demonstrate increased CV risk at clinical doses. Hypothyroid agents should not be used in combination with sympathomimetic agents including: stimulants, and diet pills, due to increased CV risks.
- In July 2013, the FDA issued a boxed warning for the antimalarial drug mefloquine, noting the drug's adverse neuropsychiatric side effects, and emphasizing neurological effects from the drug could "occur at any time during drug use, and can last for months to years after the drug is stopped or can be permanent".

== In other jurisdictions ==
In China, a warning text (警示语) may be added to a package insert, either voluntarily by the manufacturer or at the request of NMPA (formerly CFDA, the Chinese counterpart of FDA). Although no formatting requirement is found in law, the typical formatting is similar to the American counterpart with boxed text at the top of the insert. The CFDA/NMPA has used its power to mandate a warning on fluoroquinolones, ceftriaxone, aciclovir, and pioglitazone.

Health Canada terms its version of boxed warnings "serious warnings and precautions box". The formatting is similar to the US counterpart; an example for Paxlovid can be seen on Pfizer's website.
