= Ciglitazone =

Chemical compound

Clinical data
- ATC code: none

Identifiers
- IUPAC name: 5-{4-[(1-methylcyclohexyl)methoxy]benzyl}-1,3-thiazolidine-2,4-dione
- CAS Number: 74772-77-3
- PubChem CID: 2750
- IUPHAR/BPS: 2711
- DrugBank: DB09201
- ChemSpider: 2648
- UNII: U8QXS1WU8G
- KEGG: D03493
- ChEMBL: ChEMBL7002
- CompTox Dashboard (EPA): DTXSID0040757
- ECHA InfoCard: 100.220.474

Chemical and physical data
- Formula: C_{18}H_{23}NO_{3}S
- Molar mass: 333.45 g·mol^{−1}
- 3D model (JSmol): Interactive image
- SMILES: O=C1NC(=O)SC1Cc3ccc(OCC2(C)CCCCC2)cc3
- InChI: InChI=1S/C18H23NO3S/c1-18(9-3-2-4-10-18)12-22-14-7-5-13(6-8-14)11-15-16(20)19-17(21)23-15/h5-8,15H,2-4,9-12H2,1H3,(H,19,20,21); Key:YZFWTZACSRHJQD-UHFFFAOYSA-N

Ciglitazone (INN) is a thiazolidinedione. Developed by Takeda Pharmaceuticals in the early 1980s, it is considered the prototypical compound for the thiazolidinedione class.

Ciglitazone was never used as a medication, but it sparked interest in the effects of thiazolidinediones. Several analogues were later developed, some of which—such as pioglitazone and troglitazone—made it to the market.

Ciglitazone significantly decreases VEGF production by human granulosa cells in an in vitro study, and may potentially be used in ovarian hyperstimulation syndrome. Ciglitazone is a potent and selective PPARγ ligand. It binds to the PPARγ ligand-binding domain with an EC50 of 3.0 μM. Ciglitazone is active in vivo as an anti-hyperglycemic agent in the ob/ob murine model. Inhibits HUVEC differentiation and angiogenesis and also stimulates adipogenesis and decreases osteoblastogenesis in human mesenchymal stem cells.
