= Azemiglitazone =

Chemical compound

Clinical data
- Other names: Azemiglitazone potassium; MSDC-0602; MSDC-0602K

Legal status
- Legal status: Investigational

Identifiers
- IUPAC name: 5-[[4-[2-(3-Methoxyphenyl)-2-oxoethoxy]phenyl]methyl]-1,3-thiazolidine-2,4-dione
- CAS Number: 1133819-87-0
- PubChem CID: 25230266
- DrugBank: DB16028
- ChemSpider: 32698412
- UNII: 81MXZ6QOBM
- ChEMBL: ChEMBL4291468

Chemical and physical data
- Formula: C_{19}H_{17}NO_{5}S
- Molar mass: 371.41 g·mol^{−1}
- 3D model (JSmol): Interactive image
- SMILES: COC1=CC=CC(=C1)C(=O)COC2=CC=C(C=C2)CC3C(=O)NC(=O)S3
- InChI: InChI=1S/C19H17NO5S/c1-24-15-4-2-3-13(10-15)16(21)11-25-14-7-5-12(6-8-14)9-17-18(22)20-19(23)26-17/h2-8,10,17H,9,11H2,1H3,(H,20,22,23); Key:YAUMOGALQJYOJQ-UHFFFAOYSA-N

Azemiglitazone (MSDC-0602) is a novel insulin sensitizer designed to retain the effect of thiazolidinediones on mitochondrial pyruvate carriers with limited PPAR-gamma binding. It is hoped to have fewer adverse effects than the thiazolidinediones and is being developed by Cirius Therapeutics for type 2 diabetes and non-alcoholic fatty liver disease. It is formulated as its potassium salt, azemiglitazone potassium (MSDC-0602K).
