= Darglitazone =

Chemical compound

Legal status
- Legal status: Development terminated

Identifiers
- IUPAC name: 5-[(4-[3-(5-Methyl-2-phenyl-1,3-oxazol-4-yl)propanoyl]phenyl)methyl]-1,3-thiazolidine-2,4-dione
- CAS Number: 141200-24-0
- PubChem CID: 60870
- ChemSpider: 54854
- UNII: AVP9C03Z3K
- ChEMBL: ChEMBL55624
- CompTox Dashboard (EPA): DTXSID3057644

Chemical and physical data
- Formula: C_{23}H_{20}N_{2}O_{4}S
- Molar mass: 420.48 g·mol^{−1}
- 3D model (JSmol): Interactive image
- SMILES: CC1=C(N=C(O1)C2=CC=CC=C2)CCC(=O)C3=CC=C(C=C3)CC4C(=O)NC(=O)S4
- InChI: InChI=1S/C23H20N2O4S/c1-14-18(24-22(29-14)17-5-3-2-4-6-17)11-12-19(26)16-9-7-15(8-10-16)13-20-21(27)25-23(28)30-20/h2-10,20H,11-13H2,1H3,(H,25,27,28); Key:QQKNSPHAFATFNQ-UHFFFAOYSA-N

Darglitazone (previously known as CP 86325-2) is a member of the thiazolidinedione class of drugs and an agonist of peroxisome proliferator-activated receptor-γ (PPAR-γ), an orphan member of the nuclear receptor superfamily of transcription factors. It has a variety of insulin-sensitizing effects, such as improving glycemic and lipidemic control, and was studied by Pfizer as a potential treatment of metabolic disorders such as type 2 diabetes mellitus.

Its development was terminated in 1999.

== Synthesis ==
Darglitazone can be synthesized starting from benzaldehyde and the oxime of 2,3-butanedione.

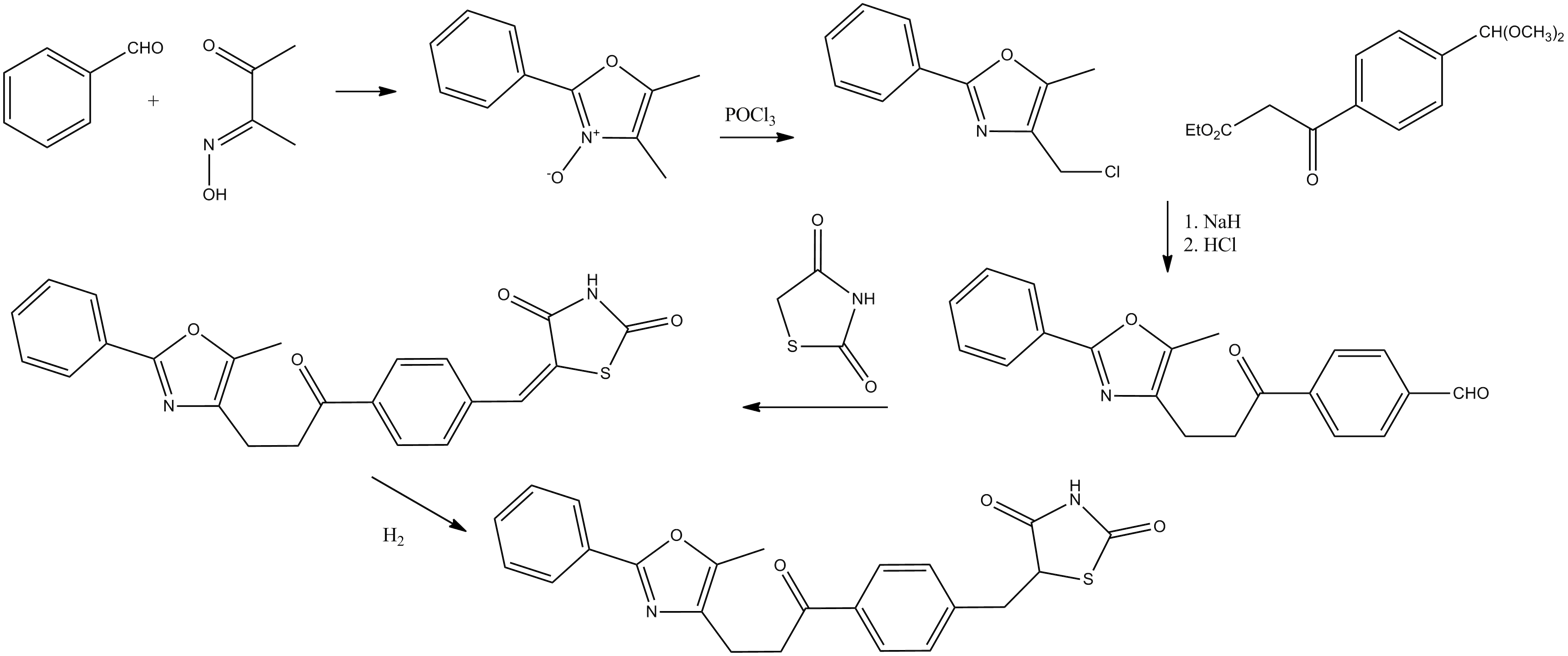
Synthesis of darglitazone
