= Lobeglitazone =

Chemical compound

Clinical data
- Trade names: Duvie
- Other names: CKD-501
- Routes of administration: Oral
- ATC code: A10BG04 (WHO)

Legal status
- Legal status: Rx-only in South Korea

Pharmacokinetic data
- Protein binding: >99%
- Metabolism: liver (CYP2C9, 2C19, and 1A2)
- Elimination half-life: 7.8–9.8 hours

Identifiers
- IUPAC name: 5-[(4-[2-([6-(4-Methoxyphenoxy)pyrimidin-4-yl]-methylamino)ethoxy]phenyl)methyl]-1,3-thiazolidine-2,4-dione
- CAS Number: 607723-33-1
- PubChem CID: 9826451
- DrugBank: DB09198
- ChemSpider: 8002194
- UNII: MY89F08K5D
- KEGG: D11923

Chemical and physical data
- Formula: C_{24}H_{24}N_{4}O_{5}S
- Molar mass: 480.54 g·mol^{−1}
- 3D model (JSmol): Interactive image
- SMILES: CN(CCOC1=CC=C(C=C1)CC2C(=O)NC(=O)S2)C3=CC(=NC=N3)OC4=CC=C(C=C4)OC
- InChI: InChI=1S/C24H24N4O5S/c1-28(21-14-22(26-15-25-21)33-19-9-7-17(31-2)8-10-19)11-12-32-18-5-3-16(4-6-18)13-20-23(29)27-24(30)34-20/h3-10,14-15,20H,11-13H2,1-2H3,(H,27,29,30); Key:CHHXEZSCHQVSRE-UHFFFAOYSA-N

Lobeglitazone (trade name Duvie, Chong Kun Dang) is an antidiabetic drug in the thiazolidinedione class of drugs. As an agonist for both PPARα and PPARγ, it works as an insulin sensitizer by binding to the PPAR receptors in fat cells and making the cells more responsive to insulin.

== Medical uses ==
Lobeglitazone is used to assist regulation of blood glucose level of diabetes mellitus type 2 patients. It can be used alone or in combination with metformin.

Lobeglitazone was approved by the Ministry of Food and Drug Safety (Korea) in 2013, and the postmarketing surveillance is on progress until 2019.

== Pharmacokinetics ==
The absolute bioavailability of lobeglitazone is about 95% in rat. In human, the mean steady state clearance (CL_{ss}/F) was 1.13 L/h across in 1 to 4 mg dose range. In the dose range, the mean half-life was 10.3 h. Urine excretion was negligible amount in elimination of lobeglitazone in rat and human.

The plasma protein binding of the drug is over 99%. The average blood-to-plasma concentration ratio was 0.636. The unbound fraction of lobeglitazone in microsomal incubation medium was 0.479.

Lobeglitazone was primarily distributed to the liver with tissue-to-plasma concentration ratio as 5.59, and less to heart, lung, and fat. The tissue to plasma concentration ratios were ranged from about 0.25 to 4.0 for major tissues, in rat.

Among six major membrane transporters recommended by the United States Food and Drug Administration, lobeglitazone interacts with OATP1B1, OAT3, and MDR1. In vitro, lobeglitazone was a substrate of rodent OATP1B2. Lobeglitazone interacted with CYP1A2, 2C9 and 2C19.

Distribution to liver of lobeglitazone was inhibited by atorvastatin, in rats.
