= Rivoglitazone =

Chemical compound

Clinical data
- ATC code: none

Identifiers
- IUPAC name: (RS)-5-{4-[(6-methoxy-1-methyl-1H-benzimidazol-2-yl) methoxy]benzyl}-1,3-thiazolidine-2,4-dione
- CAS Number: 185428-18-6
- PubChem CID: 3055168
- ChemSpider: 2316729
- UNII: 3A3N0634Q6
- ChEMBL: ChEMBL2104753
- CompTox Dashboard (EPA): DTXSID00870164

Chemical and physical data
- Formula: C_{20}H_{19}N_{3}O_{4}S
- Molar mass: 397.45 g·mol^{−1}
- 3D model (JSmol): Interactive image
- SMILES: CN1C2=C(C=CC(=C2)OC)N=C1COC3=CC=C(C=C3)CC4C(=O)NC(=O)S4
- InChI: InChI=1S/C20H19N3O4S/c1-23-16-10-14(26-2)7-8-15(16)21-18(23)11-27-13-5-3-12(4-6-13)9-17-19(24)22-20(25)28-17/h3-8,10,17H,9,11H2,1-2H3,(H,22,24,25); Key:XMSXOLDPMGMWTH-UHFFFAOYSA-N

Rivoglitazone (INN) is a thiazolidinedione derivative undergoing research for use in the treatment of type 2 diabetes.

It is being developed by Daiichi Sankyo.
