= Pioglitazone =

Chemical compound

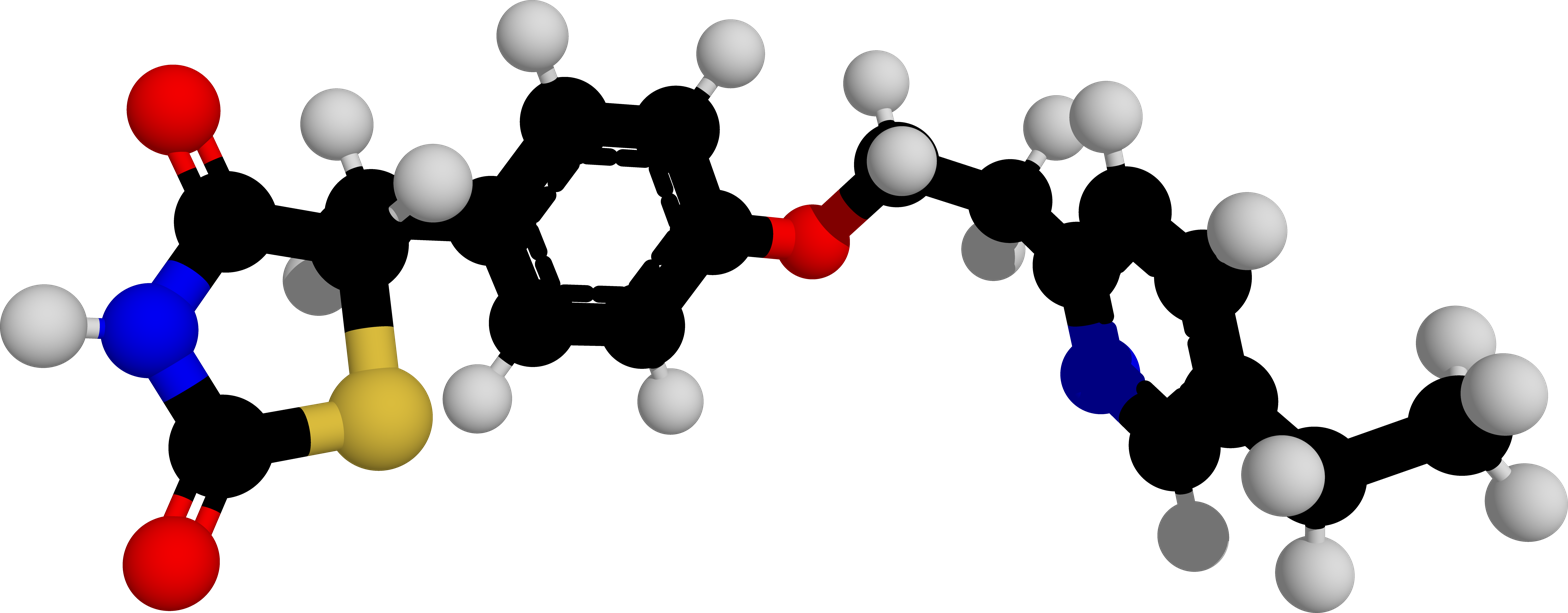

Clinical data
- Pronunciation: /ˌpaɪəˈɡlɪtəˌzoʊn/ PYE-uh-GLIT-uh-zohn
- Trade names: Actos, others
- AHFS/Drugs.com: Monograph
- MedlinePlus: a699016
- License data: US DailyMed: Pioglitazone
- Pregnancy category: AU: B3
- Routes of administration: By mouth
- Drug class: Thiazolidinedione
- ATC code: A10BG03 (WHO)

Legal status
- Legal status: AU: S4 (Prescription only); UK: POM (Prescription only); US: ℞-only; EU: Rx-only; In general: ℞ (Prescription only)

Pharmacokinetic data
- Protein binding: >99%
- Metabolism: Liver (CYP2C8)
- Elimination half-life: 3–7 hours
- Excretion: Bile duct

Identifiers
- IUPAC name: (RS)-5-(4-[2-(5-ethylpyridin-2-yl)ethoxy]benzyl)thiazolidine-2,4-dione
- CAS Number: 111025-46-8
- PubChem CID: 4829
- IUPHAR/BPS: 2694
- DrugBank: DB01132
- ChemSpider: 4663
- UNII: X4OV71U42S
- KEGG: D08378; as HCl: D00945
- ChEBI: CHEBI:8228
- ChEMBL: ChEMBL595
- CompTox Dashboard (EPA): DTXSID3037129
- ECHA InfoCard: 100.114.441

Chemical and physical data
- Formula: C_{19}H_{20}N_{2}O_{3}S
- Molar mass: 356.44 g·mol^{−1}
- 3D model (JSmol): Interactive image
- Chirality: Racemic mixture
- Melting point: 183 to 184 °C (361 to 363 °F)
- SMILES: O=C1NC(=O)SC1Cc3ccc(OCCc2ncc(cc2)CC)cc3
- InChI: InChI=1S/C19H20N2O3S/c1-2-13-3-6-15(20-12-13)9-10-24-16-7-4-14(5-8-16)11-17-18(22)21-19(23)25-17/h3-8,12,17H,2,9-11H2,1H3,(H,21,22,23); Key:HYAFETHFCAUJAY-UHFFFAOYSA-N

Pioglitazone, sold under the brand name Actos among others, is an anti-diabetic medication used to treat type 2 diabetes. It may be used with metformin, a sulfonylurea, or insulin. Use is recommended together with exercise and diet. It is not recommended in type 1 diabetes. It is taken by mouth.

Common side effects include headaches, muscle pains, inflammation of the throat, and swelling. Serious side effects may include bladder cancer, low blood sugar, heart failure, and osteoporosis. Use is not recommended in pregnancy or breastfeeding. It is in the thiazolidinedione (TZD) class and works by improving sensitivity of tissues to insulin.

Pioglitazone was patented in 1985, and came into medical use in 1999. It is available as a generic medication. In 2023, it was the 133rd most commonly prescribed medication in the United States, with more than 4 million prescriptions. It was withdrawn in France and Germany in 2011.

== Medical uses ==
Pioglitazone is used to lower blood glucose levels in type 2 diabetes either alone or in combination with sulfonylurea, metformin, or insulin. The effects of pioglitazone have been compared in a Cochrane systematic review to that of other blood sugar lowering-medicine, including metformin, acarbose, and repaglinide, as well as with appropriate diet and exercise, not showing any benefit in reducing the chance of developing type 2 diabetes in people at risk. It did, however, show reduction of risk of developing type 2 diabetes when compared to a placebo or to no treatment. These results should be interpreted considering that most of the data of the studies included in this review were of low or very-low certainty.

While pioglitazone does decrease blood sugar levels, the main study that looked at the medication found no difference in the main cardiovascular outcomes that were looked at. The secondary outcome of death from all causes, myocardial infarction, and stroke were lower.

Pioglitazone has been found to reduce all-cause mortality in type 2 diabetic patients compared to other therapies, with a 60% reduction in mortality in those exposed to pioglitazone, compared to those never exposed. Another study found an all-cause mortality hazard ratio of 0.33 for pioglitazone after adjusting for >40 covariates, compared to insulin. Due to insufficient data on all-cause mortality, cardiovascular mortality, myocardial infarction and stroke, this was not possible to compare in a more recent review.

== Contraindications ==
Pioglitazone cannot be used in patients with a known hypersensitivity to pioglitazone, other thiazolidinediones or any of the components of its pharmaceutical forms. It is ineffective and possibly harmful in diabetes mellitus type 1 and diabetic ketoacidosis. Its safety in pregnancy, lactation (breastfeeding) and people under 18 is not established.

Given previous experiences with the related drug troglitazone, acute diseases of the liver are regarded as a contraindication for pioglitazone.

== Side effects ==
A press release by GlaxoSmithKline in February 2007 noted that there is a greater incidence of fractures of the upper arms, hands and feet in female diabetics given rosiglitazone compared with those given metformin or glyburide. The information was based on data from the ADOPT trial. Following release of this statement, Takeda Pharmaceutical Company, the developer of pioglitazone (sold as Actos in many markets) admitted that it has similar implications for female patients.

The risk of hypoglycemia is low in the absence of other drugs that lower blood glucose.

Pioglitazone can cause fluid retention and peripheral edema. As a result, it may precipitate congestive heart failure (which worsens with fluid overload in those at risk). It may cause anemia. Mild weight gain is common due to increase in subcutaneous adipose tissue. In studies, patients on pioglitazone had an increased proportion of upper respiratory tract infection, sinusitis, headache, myalgia and tooth problems.

Chronic administration of the drug has led to occasional instances of cholestatic hepatitis, reversible upon drug discontinuation.

On 30 July 2007, an Advisory Committee of the Food and Drug Administration concluded that the use of rosiglitazone for the treatment of type 2 diabetes was associated with a greater risk of "myocardial ischemic events" when compared to placebo, but when compared to other diabetes drugs, there was no increased risk. Pioglitazone is currently being reviewed. A meta-analysis released subsequently showed that pioglitazone reduced the risk of ischemic cardiac events rather than increased the risk, but increased CHF.

A 2020 Cochrane systematic review assessed occurrence of adverse effects with use of pioglitazone, but was not able to reach any conclusions due to insufficient data on included studies.

=== Bladder cancer ===
On 9 June 2011, the French Agency for the Safety of Health Products decided to withdraw pioglitazone due to high risk of bladder cancer. This suspension was based on the results of an epidemiological study conducted by the French National Health Insurance. According to the results of the epidemiological study, the French agency found that patients, who were taking Actos for a long time to aid in type 2 diabetes mellitus, had a significantly increased risk of bladder cancer compared with patients who were taking other diabetes medications. On 10 June 2011, Germany's Federal Institute for Drugs and Medical Devices also advised doctors not to prescribe the medication until further investigation of the cancer risk had been conducted.

On 15 June 2011, the U.S. FDA announced that pioglitazone use for more than one year may be associated with an increased risk of bladder cancer, and two months later the label was updated with an additional warning about this risk.

A 2017 meta-analysis found no difference in the rates of bladder cancer attributed to pioglitazone.

== Drug interactions ==
Combination with sulfonylureas or insulin increase the risk of hypoglycemia.

Treatment with pioglitazone decreases the effectiveness of oral contraceptions containing ethinyl estradiol and norethindrone.

== Mechanism of action ==
Pioglitazone selectively stimulates the nuclear receptor peroxisome proliferator-activated receptor gamma (PPAR-γ) and to a lesser extent PPAR-α. It modulates the transcription of the genes involved in the control of glucose and lipid metabolism in the muscle, adipose tissue, and the liver. As a result, pioglitazone reduces insulin resistance in the liver and peripheral tissues, decreases gluconeogenesis in the liver, and reduces quantity of glucose and glycated hemoglobin in the bloodstream.

Since 2004, pioglitazone and other active TZDs have been shown to bind to the outer mitochondrial membrane protein mitoNEET with affinity comparable to that of pioglitazone for PPARγ.

Leriglitazone is a metabolite.

== Society and culture ==
=== Economics ===
In 2008, it generated the tenth-highest amount of money for a medication in the U.S. in 2008, with sales exceeding $2.4 billion.

To 2020, no study has examined the socioeconomic effects of utilization of pioglitazone.

=== Brand names ===
Pioglitazone is marketed as Actos in the United States, Canada, the UK and Germany, Glustin in the European Union, Glizone and Pioz in India by Zydus Cadila and USV Limited, respectively, and Zactos in Mexico by Takeda Pharmaceuticals. On 17 August 2012, the US FDA announced its approval of the first generic version of Actos.

== Research ==
=== Psychiatry ===
==== Bipolar disorder ====
Pioglitazone has been repurposed as an add-on treatment for depressive episodes in subjects with bipolar disorder. However, meta-analytic evidence is based on very few studies and does not suggest any efficacy of pioglitazone in the treatment of bipolar depression.

==== Major depression ====
There is research that suggests that pioglitazone may be useful for treating major depression.

=== Other illnesses ===
According to a 2020 meta-analysis of 48 clinical trials, Pioglitazone and Roux-en-Y gastric bypass surgery were the two most effective treatments for non-alcoholic steatohepatitis; the analysis' authors based this conclusion on improvements to the non-alcoholic fatty liver disease scores of trial participants.

A 2021 meta-analysis of three clinical trials found that Pioglitazone had not been proven effective to treat Alzheimer's disease.

== See also ==
- Abdominal obesity (pioglitazone mentioned)
