= Metabolic Score for Insulin Resistance =

Measure of insulin sensitivity

The Metabolic Score for Insulin Resistance (METS-IR) is a metabolic index designed to quantify peripheral insulin sensitivity in humans. It was first described by Bello-Chavolla et al. in 2018 and developed by the Metabolic Research Disease Unit at the Instituto Nacional de Ciencias Médicas Salvador Zubirán. METS-IR was validated in the Mexican population against the euglycemic hyperinsulinemic clamp and the frequently-sampled intravenous glucose tolerance test. It offers a non-insulin-based alternative to traditional methods such as SPINA Carb, HOMA-IR, and QUICKI. METS-IR is currently validated for assessing cardiometabolic risk in Latino population.

== Derivation and validation ==
METS-IR was generated using linear regression against the M value adjusted by lean body mass obtained from the glucose clamp technique in Mexican subjects with and without type 2 diabetes mellitus. It is estimated using fasting laboratory values including glucose (in mg/dL), triglycerides (mg/dL) and high-density lipoprotein cholesterol (HDL-C, in mg/dL) along with body-mass index (BMI). The index can be estimated using the following formula:

$$METS-IR =\frac{\ln[2*Glucose (mg/dL) + Triglycerides (mg/dL)]*BMI (kg/m^2)}{\ln[HDL-C (mg/dL)]}$$

The index holds a significant correlation with the M-value adjusted by lean mass (ρ = −0.622) obtained from the euglycemic hyperinsulinaemic clamp study adjusted for age and gender as well as minimal model estimates of glucose sensitivity. In an open population cohort study in Mexican population, METS-IR was shown to predict incident type 2 diabetes mellitus and a value of METS-IR >50.0 suggested up to three-fold higher risk of developing type 2 diabetes after an average of three years. In a nation-wide population-based study of Chinese subjects, METS-IR was also shown to identify subjects with metabolic syndrome independent of adiposity. METS-IR also predicts visceral fat content, subcutaneous adipose tissue, fasting insulin levels and ectopic fat accumulation in liver and pancreas.

== Comparison to other indexes ==
METS-IR was compared with other non-insulin-based methods for estimating insulin sensitivity, including the Triglyceride-Glucose index (TyG), the triglyceride to HDL-C ratio, and the TyG-BMI index, showing a higher correlation and area under the ROC curve. However, in a study of Chinese subjects, Yu et al. found that TyG and TG/HDL-C performed better, likely due to ethnic differences in body composition. Given the role of ethnicity in modifying the performance of insulin sensitivity fasting-based indexes, further evaluations in different populations are required to establish performance of non-insulin-based methods.

== See also ==
- Insulin resistance
- Homeostatic model assessment
- SPINA-GBeta
- SPINA-GR
- Disposition index
- Quantitative insulin sensitivity check index
- Diabetes mellitus
- Diabetes management
