= Glucose tolerance test =

Medical test of how quickly glucose is cleared from the blood

- A diagram of glucose metabolism
- Purpose: To determine how quickly glucose is cleared from blood

The glucose tolerance test (GTT, not to be confused with GGT test) is a medical test in which glucose is given and blood samples taken afterward to determine how quickly it is cleared from the blood. The test is usually used to test for diabetes, insulin resistance, impaired beta cell function, and sometimes reactive hypoglycemia and acromegaly, or rarer disorders of carbohydrate metabolism. In the most commonly performed version of the test, an oral glucose tolerance test (OGTT), a standard dose of glucose is ingested by mouth and blood levels are checked two hours later. Many variations of the GTT have been devised over the years for various purposes, with different standard doses of glucose, different routes of administration, different intervals and durations of sampling, and various substances measured in addition to blood glucose.

== History ==
The glucose tolerance test was first described in 1923 by Jerome W. Conn.

The test was based on the previous work in 1913 by A. T. B. Jacobson in determining that carbohydrate ingestion results in blood glucose fluctuations, and the premise (named the Staub-Traugott Phenomenon after its first observers H. Staub in 1921 and K. Traugott in 1922) that a normal patient fed glucose will rapidly return to normal levels of blood glucose after an initial spike, and will see improved reaction to subsequent glucose feedings.

== Testing ==
Since the 1970s, the World Health Organization and other organizations interested in diabetes agreed on a standard dose and duration.

=== Preparation ===
The patient is instructed not to restrict carbohydrate intake in the days or weeks before the test. The test should not be done during an illness, as results may not reflect the patient's glucose metabolism when healthy. A full adult dose should not be given to a person weighing less than 42.6 kg (94 lb), or the excessive glucose may produce a false positive result. Usually the OGTT is performed in the morning as glucose tolerance can exhibit a diurnal rhythm with a significant decrease in the afternoon. The patient is instructed to fast (water is allowed) for 8–12 hours prior to the tests. Medication such as large doses of salicylates, diuretics, anticonvulsants, and oral contraceptives affect the glucose tolerance test.

=== Procedure ===
1. A zero time (baseline) blood sample is drawn.
2. The patient is then given a measured dose (below) of glucose solution to drink within a 5-minute time frame.
3. Blood is drawn at intervals for measurement of glucose (blood sugar), and sometimes insulin levels. The intervals and number of samples vary according to the purpose of the test. For simple diabetes screening, the most important sample is the 2 hour sample and the 0 and 2 hour samples may be the only ones collected. A laboratory may continue to collect blood for up to 6 hours depending on the protocol requested by the physician.

=== Dose of glucose and variations ===
- 75 g of oral dose is the recommendation of the WHO to be used in all adults, and is the main dosage used in the United States. The dose is adjusted for weight only in children. The dose should be drunk within 5 minutes.
- A variant is often used in pregnancy to screen for gestational diabetes, with a screening test of 50 g over one hour. If elevated, this is followed with a test of 100 g over three hours.
- In UK general practice, the standard glucose load was provided by 394 ml of the energy drink Lucozade with original carbonated flavour, but this is being superseded by purpose-made drinks.

=== Substances measured and variations ===
If renal glycosuria (sugar excreted in the urine despite normal levels in the blood) is suspected, urine samples may also be collected for testing along with the fasting and 2 hour blood tests.

== Results ==
- Fasting plasma glucose (measured before the OGTT begins) should be below 5.6 mmol/L (100 mg/dL). Fasting levels between 5.6 and 6.9 mmol/L (100 and 125 mg/dL) indicate prediabetes ("impaired fasting glucose"), and fasting levels repeatedly at or above 7.0 mmol/L (>126 mg/dL) are diagnostic of diabetes.
- For a 2 hour GTT with 75 g intake, a glucose level below 7.8 mmol/L (140 mg/dL) is normal, whereas higher levels indicate hyperglycemia. Blood plasma glucose between 7.8 mmol/L (140 mg/dL) and 11.1 mmol/L (200 mg/dL) indicate "impaired glucose tolerance", and levels at or above 11.1 mmol/L at 2 hours confirm a diagnosis of diabetes.

For gestational diabetes, the American College of Obstetricians and Gynecologists (ACOG) recommends a two-step procedure, wherein the first step is a 50 g glucose dose. If after 1 hour the blood glucose level is more than 7.8 mmol/L (140 mg/dL), it is followed by a 100 g glucose dose. The diagnosis of gestational diabetes is then defined by a blood glucose level meeting or exceeding the cutoff values on at least two intervals, with cutoffs as follows:

- Before glucose intake (fasting): 5.3 mmol/L (95 mg/dL)
- 1 hour after drinking the glucose solution: 10.0 mmol/L (180 mg/dL)
- 2 hours: 8.6 mmol/L (155 mg/dL)
- 3 hours: 7.8 mmol/L (140 mg/dL)

== Sample method ==
The diagnosis criteria stated above by the World Health Organization (WHO) are for venous samples only (a blood sample taken from a vein in the arm). An increasingly popular method for measuring blood glucose is to sample capillary or finger-prick blood, which is less invasive, more convenient for the patient and requires minimal training to conduct. Though fasting blood glucose levels have been shown to be similar in both capillary and venous samples, postprandial blood glucose levels (those measured after a meal) can vary. The diagnosis criteria issued by the WHO are only suitable for venous blood samples. Given the increasing popularity of capillary testing, the WHO has recommended that a conversion factor between the two sample types be calculated, but as of 2017 no conversion factor had been issued by the WHO, despite some medical professionals adopting their own. A 2020 study on pregnant women for gestational diabetes mellitus (GDM) found that 0-hour venous and capillary levels were similar, but that 2-hour samples were different. The authors compared their study with others, and concluded that capillary samples could be used for diagnosis of GDM during pregnancy using corrected cutoffs with acceptable accuracy in an antenatal care setting.

== Variations ==
A standard two-hour GTT (glucose tolerance test) is sufficient to diagnose or exclude all forms of diabetes mellitus at all but the earliest stages of development.

Longer tests have been used for a variety of other purposes, such as detecting reactive hypoglycemia or defining subsets of hypothalamic obesity. Insulin levels are sometimes measured to detect insulin resistance or deficiency.

The GTT (glucose tolerance test) is of limited value in the diagnosis of reactive hypoglycemia, since normal levels do not preclude the diagnosis, abnormal levels do not prove that the patient's other symptoms are related to a demonstrated atypical OGTT, and many people without symptoms of reactive hypoglycemia may have the late low glucose.

== Oral glucose challenge test ==
The oral glucose challenge test (OGCT) is a short version of the OGTT, used to check pregnant women for signs of gestational diabetes. It can be done at any time of day, not on an empty stomach. The test involves 50 g of glucose, with a reading after one hour.

== Limitations of OGTT ==
The OGTT does not distinguish between insulin resistance in peripheral tissues and reduced capacity of the pancreas beta-cells to produce insulin. The OGTT is less accurate than the hyperinsulinemic-euglycemic clamp technique (the "gold standard" for measuring insulin resistance), or the insulin tolerance test, but is technically less difficult. Neither of the two technically demanding tests can be easily applied in a clinical setting or used in epidemiological studies. HOMA-IR (homeostatic model assessment) is a convenient way of measuring insulin resistance in normal subjects, which can be used in epidemiological studies, but can give erroneous results for diabetic patients.

== See also ==
- Metabolic Score for Insulin Resistance (METS-IR)
- Homeostatic model assessment
- SPINA-GBeta
- SPINA-GR
- Disposition index
- Diabetes mellitus
- Diabetes management
