= Pancreatic beta cell function =

- Other names: G_{β}, HOMA-Beta, IGI, SPINA-GBeta
- Specialty: Endocrinology

Pancreatic beta cell function (synonyms G_{β} or, if calculated from fasting concentrations of insulin and glucose, HOMA-Beta or SPINA-GBeta) is one of the preconditions of euglycaemia, i.e. normal blood sugar regulation. It is defined as insulin secretory capacity, i.e. the maximum amount of insulin to be produced by beta cells in a given unit of time.

== Physiology and pathophysiology ==
Beta cells play a paramount role in glucose homeostasis. Progressive loss of insulin secretory capacity is a key defect associated with the transition from a healthy glycaemic state to hyperglycaemia, characteristic of untreated diabetes mellitus. In type 1 diabetes mellitus and pancreatogenic diabetes beta cell destruction is a primary event from the perspective of the feedback loop. In type 2 diabetes beta cell dysfunction is an essential constituent as well, but subsequent to the development of insulin resistance. Other mechanisms, including lipotoxicity, amyloid deposition, oxidative stress, mitochondrial dysfunction, ER stress and inflammation may be involved as well. The beta cell loss in type 2 diabetes is mainly caused by reduced beta cell number rather than size. Hyperglycaemia becomes clinically significant once insulin over-secretion can no longer compensate for the degree of insulin resistance.

It remains an unsolved question if impaired pancreatic beta cell function or hypersecretion of insulin represent the primary event in the pathogenesis of type 2 diabetes. Both scenarios may be cause and consequence, and it has been postulated that the direction of causality depends on the respective subtype of diabetes. Therefore, they may be part of a complex feedback loop involving glucose toxicity leading to a biphasic response, thereby preventing neoplastic effects of dynamical compensation by mutant takeover.

== Assessing beta cell function ==
Measuring beta-cell function is a challenge, since insulin secretory capacity cannot be readily assessed. Therefore, indirect methods of measurement have been developed. They include dynamic and static function tests.

=== Single-point measurements ===
One-time measurements of certain hormones or metabolites provide some limited information. Examples are:

- Fasting glucose concentration
- Fasting or random C-peptide concentration

Although single-point measurements have the benefit of being convenient and inexpensive, they are generally not regareded as sufficiently informative for early diagnosis of impaired glucose homeostasis or early-stage type 1 diabetes.

=== Dynamic function tests ===
Dynamic function tests for beta-cell function include:

- Oral glucose tolerance testing (OGTT)
- Intravenous glucose tolerance tests (IVGTT)
- Meal tolerance tests
- Hyperglycaemic clamp

=== Static function tests ===
Static function tests for the assessment of beta-cell function comprise:

- Insulin-glucose ratio
- Amended insulin-glucose ratio
- HOMA-Beta
- SPINA-GBeta

== Challenges and limits ==
Measuring beta-cell function requires the rate of secretion to be interpreted in relation to the prevailing glucose concentration. Therefore, a mathematical model is needed that links the time courses of insulin secretion and glucose concentration as a mechanistic causal relationship.

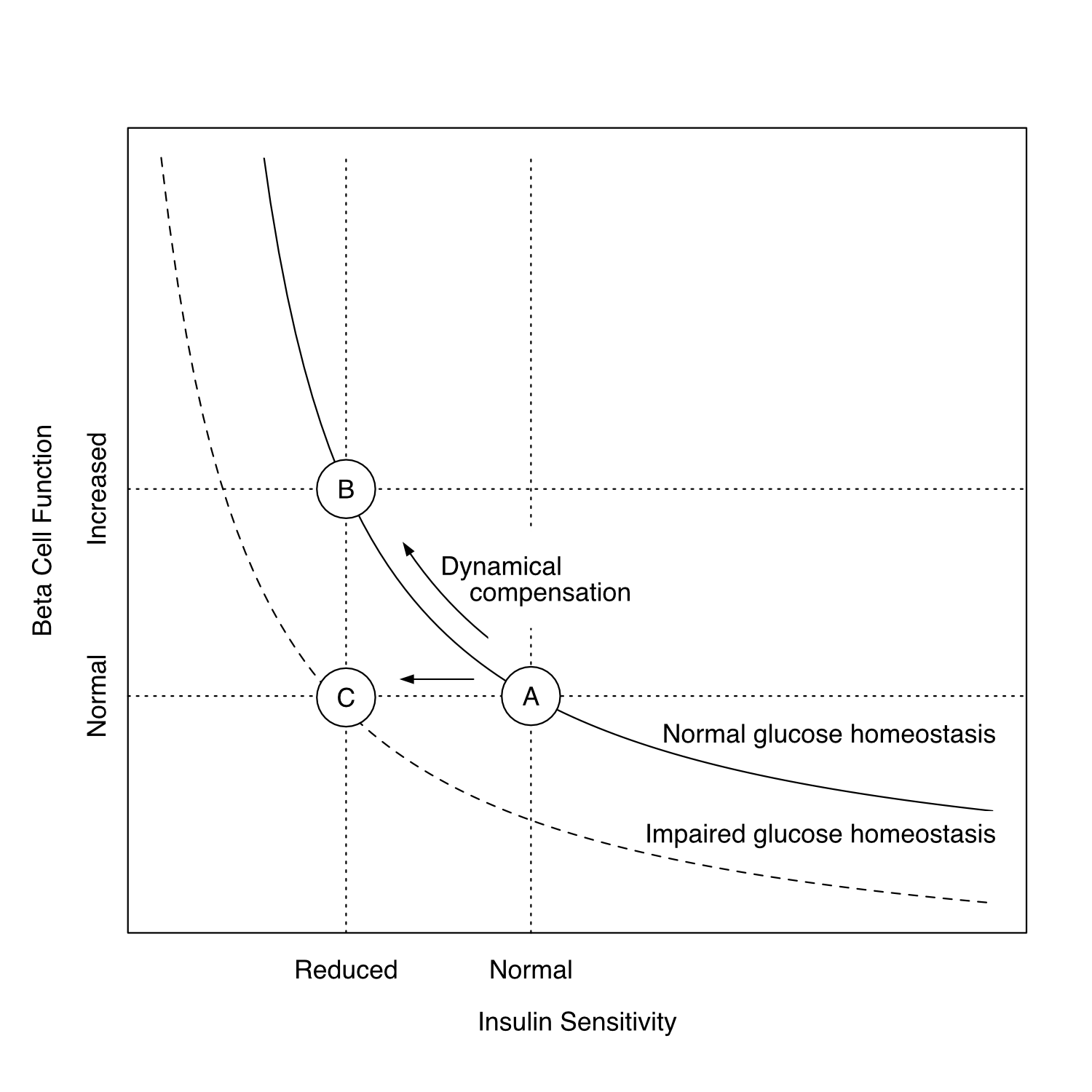
Hyberbolic relationship between insulin sensitivity and beta cell function showing dynamical compensation in "healthy" insulin resistance (transition from A to B) and the evolution of type 2 diabetes mellitus (transition from A to C). Changed from Cobelli et al. 2007 and Hannon et al. 2018

Additionally, beta-cell function has to be interpreted in light of the prevailing insulin sensitivity. This is necessary since the beta cell mass is adjusted as required by dynamical compensation, giving rise to a hyperbolic relationship between insulin sensitivity and beta cell function. In the state of insulin resistance beta cells proliferate and their secretory capacity subsequently rises. One possibility to address this relation is to resort to a normalization of beta cell function based on a disposition metric. The disposition index, calculated as product of insulin sensitivity and beta cell function, is assumed to be a constant during the development of insulin resistance. It is generally assumed that the glucose tolerance of an individual is related to the disposition index. In this model, different values of glucose tolerance are represented by different hyperbolas, so that within one hyperbola the product of insulin sensitivity and beta cell function remains a constant.

In summary, to provide a meaningful mechanistic explanation of insulin-glucose homeostasis, beta cell function and insulin sensitivity have to be assessed simultaneously and it is necessary to interpret all observations in the context of insulin sensitivity or resistance.

== See also ==
- Insulin resistance
- Chronic Somogyi rebound
- Hyperinsulinemia
- Insulinoma
- Nesidioblastosis
