= Disposition index =

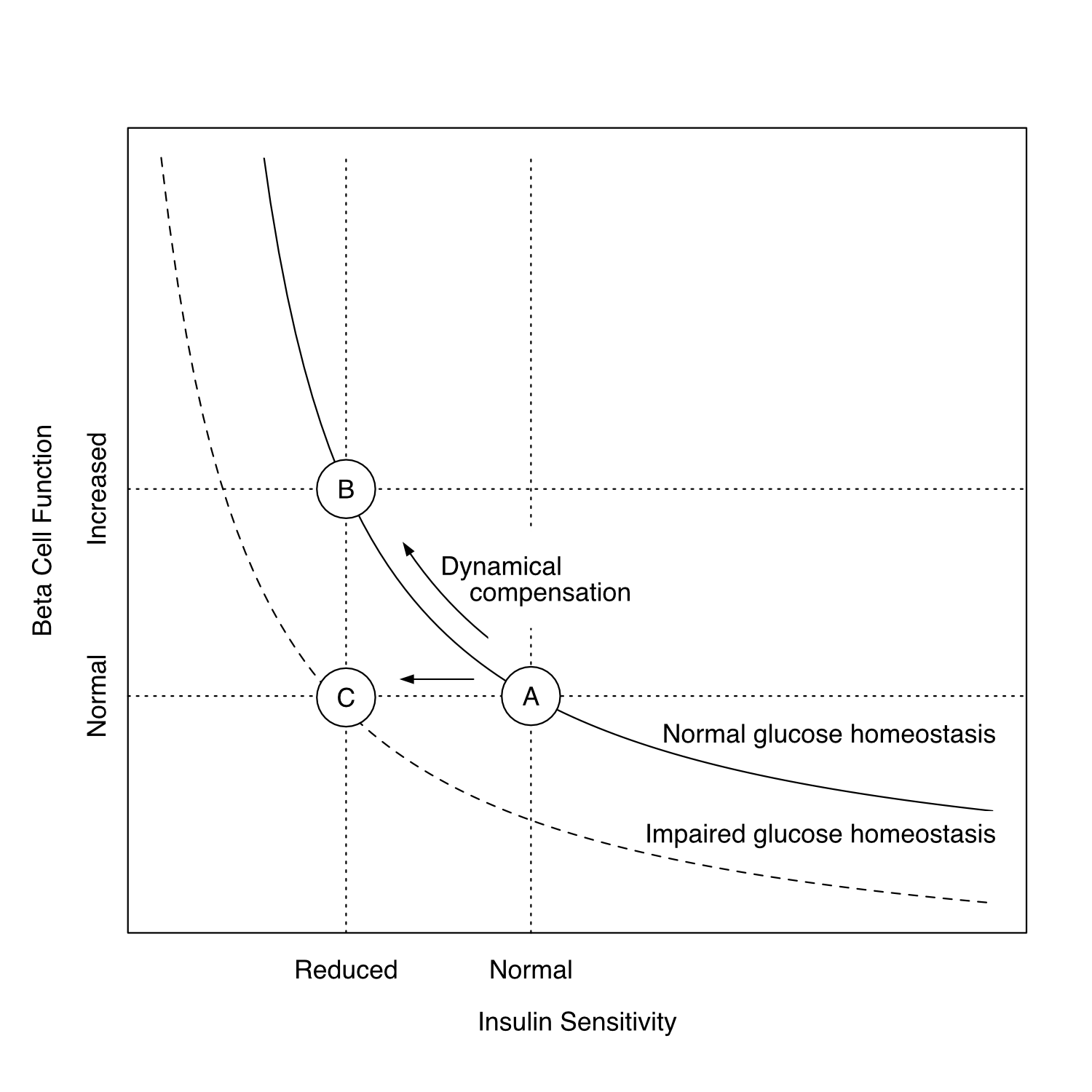
Hyperbolic relationship between insulin sensitivity and beta cell function showing dynamical compensation in "healthy" insulin resistance (transition from A to B) and the evolution of type 2 diabetes mellitus (transition from A to C). Disposition metrics integrate beta cell function and insulin sensitivity in a way so that the results remain constant across dynamical compensation. Changed from Cobelli et al. 2007 and Hannon et al. 2018

The Disposition index (DI) is a measure for the loop gain of the insulin-glucose feedback control system. It is defined as the product of insulin sensitivity times the amount of insulin secreted in response to blood glucose levels. "Metabolically healthy" Insulin resistant individuals can maintain normal responses to blood glucose due to the fact that higher levels of insulin are secreted as long as the beta cells of the pancreas are able to increase their output of insulin to compensate for the insulin resistance. But the ratio of the incremental increase in plasma insulin associated with an incremental increase in plasma glucose (disposition index) provides a better measure of beta cell function than the plasma insulin response to a glucose challenge. Loss of function of the beta cells, reducing their capacity to compensate for insulin resistance, results in a lower disposition index.

The term was proposed in 1981 by Bergman, Phillips and Cobelli to introduce an integrated measure of glucose tolerance, which includes the quantitative contributions of beta-cell function and insulin sensitivity.

== Methods of determination ==
The disposition index can be obtained on the basis of data that provide information on insulin sensitivity and beta cell function. Suitable sources include:

- Hyperglycemic glucose clamp investigations
- Frequently-sampled intravenous glucose tolerance testing (IVGTT or FSIGT)
- Frequently-sampled oral glucose tolerance testing (OGTT or FSOGT)
- Simultaneous fasting measurements of insulin and glucose in conjunction with mathematical modelling (SPINA)

If clamp investigations are used the disposition index is defined as the product of the area under the insulin response curve ($AUC_{\Delta Insulin}$) and the insulin sensitivity index (ISI_{Clamp}, average glucose infusion rate divided by average insulin concentration) with

$DI_{Clamp}=AUC_{\Delta Insulin} \cdot ISI_{Clamp}$.

Determining the disposition index on the basis of an FSIGT requires fitting the timeseries of insulin and glucose concentrations to the minimal model of insulin-glucose homeostasis. The disposition index is then calculated as

${DI}_{FSIGT}={\varphi }_{1}\cdot{S}_{I}$

from the first phase response of plasma insulin to the glucose injection (${\varphi }_{1}$) and the insulin sensitivity index (S_{I}).

Based on an oral glucose tolerance test a disposition index can be calculated with

${DI}_{FSOGT}=IGI\cdot ISI_{composite}$

from the insulinogenic index (IGI) and the insulin sensitivity index (ISI_{composite}).

The fasting-based disposition index (SPINA-DI) can be obtained from the product of the secretory capacity of pancreatic beta cells ($G_\beta$ or SPINA-GBeta) times the insulin receptor gain ($G_R$ or SPINA-GR):

$DI_f = G_\beta \cdot G_R$.

The four approaches deliver slightly different information. Although the results of clamp-, IVGTT-, OGTT- and SPINA-derived disposition indices significantly correlate with each other the correlations are only modest. In direct comparison, the SPINA-based disposition index (SPINA-DI) had higher discriminatory power for the diagnosis of diabetes than the OGTT-based disposition index according to Matsuda and DeFronzo.

== Clinical implications ==
Disposition index is used as a measure of beta cell function and the ability of the body to dispose of a glucose load. Thus a lowering of disposition index predicts the conversion of insulin resistance to diabetes mellitus type 2. Disposition index, but not insulin resistance, can predict type 2 diabetes in persons with normal blood glucose levels, but who do not have a family history (genetic predisposition) to type 2 diabetes.

Disposition index can be increased by aerobic exercise, but only to the extent that insulin sensitivity is improved.

The static disposition index (SPINA-DI) declines with increasing adherence to mediterranean diet. This may result from increased use of other macronutrients for the provision of energy and a reduction in the chronic stimulus for dynamical compensation with consecutive insulin hypersecretion.

The disposition index is reduced in several chronic conditions including cystic fibrosis, reduced PCSK9 expression and inflammatory diseases, e.g. hidradenitis suppurativa (acne inversa).

== Predictive aspects ==
In a longitudinal evaluation of the NHANES study, a large sample of the general US population, over 10 years, a reduced static disposition index (SPINA-DI) significantly predicted all-cause mortality.

== See also ==
- SPINA-GBeta
- SPINA-GR
