= Β-cell =

B-cell may refer to:

- B cells, lymphocytes that mature in bone
- Beta cells (β cells), in the pancreatic islets that produce insulin
