= SPINA-GR =

Insulin receptor gain, biomarker

- Reference range: 1.41–9.00 mol/s
- Purpose: Medical diagnosis, research
- Test of: Insulin sensitivity
- https://doi.org/10.5281/zenodo.7479856 https://doi.org/10.5281/zenodo.15249620

SPINA-GR is a calculated biomarker for insulin sensitivity. (Note: SPINA is an acronym for "structure parameter inference approach".) It represents insulin receptor gain.

The method of calculation is based on a time-discrete nonlinear feedback model of insulin-glucose homeostasis that is rooted in the MiMe-NoCoDI modeling platform for endocrine systems.

== How to determine G_{R} ==
The index is derived from a mathematical model of insulin-glucose homeostasis that incorporates fundamental physiological motifs. For diagnostic purposes, it is calculated from fasting insulin and glucose concentrations with:

${\widehat{G}}_{R}=\frac{{G}_{1}P(\infty )({D}_{R}+\left[I\right](\infty ))}{{G}_{E}\left[I\right](\infty )[G](\infty )}-\frac{{D}_{R}}{{G}_{E}[I](\infty )}-\frac{1}{{G}_{E}}$.

[I](∞): Fasting Insulin plasma concentration (mol/L)
[G](∞): Fasting blood glucose concentration (mol/L)
G_{1}: Parameter for pharmacokinetics (154.93 s/L)
D_{R}: EC_{50} of insulin at its receptor (1,6 nmol/L)
G_{E}: Effector gain (50 s/mol)
P(∞): Constitutive endogenous glucose production (150 μmol/s)

== Clinical significance ==
=== Validity ===
Compared to healthy volunteers, SPINA-GR is significantly reduced in persons with prediabetes and diabetes mellitus, and it correlates with the M value in glucose clamp studies, triceps skinfold, subscapular skinfold and (better than HOMA-IR and QUICKI) with the two-hour value in oral glucose tolerance testing (OGTT), glucose rise in OGTT, waist-to-hip ratio, body fat content (measured via DXA) and the HbA1c fraction.

=== Clinical utility ===
Both in the FAST study, an observational case-control sequencing study including 300 persons from Germany, and in a large sample from the NHANES study, SPINA-GR differed more clearly between subjects with and without diabetes than the corresponding HOMA-IR, HOMA-IS and QUICKI indices.

== Scientific implications and other uses ==
SPINA-GR significantly correlates with biomarkers for the allostatic load. The direction is negative, i. e., higher allostatic load is associated with lower insulin sensitivity.

Together with the secretory capacity of pancreatic beta cells (SPINA-GBeta), SPINA-GR provides the foundation for the definition of a fasting based disposition index of insulin-glucose homeostasis (SPINA-DI).

In combination with SPINA-GBeta and whole-exome sequencing, calculating SPINA-GR helped to identify a new form of monogenetic diabetes (MODY) that is characterised by primary insulin resistance and results from a missense variant of the type 2 ryanodine receptor (RyR2) gene (p.N2291D).

== Pathophysiological implications ==
In lean subjects it is significantly higher than in a population with obese persons. In several populations, SPINA-GR correlated with the area under the glucose curve and 2-hour concentrations of glucose, insulin and proinsulin in oral glucose tolerance testing, concentrations of free fatty acids, ghrelin and adiponectin, and the HbA1c fraction.

SPINA-GR declines with increasing adherence to mediterranean diet, which may be explained by increased use of other macronutrients for energy production. In mice, SPINA-GR is reduced after they were fed a high-fat diet for one and three weeks.

In hidradenitis suppurativa, an inflammatory skin disease, SPINA-GR is reduced. If this state is uncompensated by increased beta-cell function the static disposition index (SPINA-DI) is reduced, resulting in the onset of diabetes mellitus.

It was observed that SPINA-GR is decreased in piglets born to hyperglycaemic mother pigs. In this situation, SPINA-GBeta is compensatorily increased, but the compensation seems to be incomplete, since SPINA-DI remains reduced.

== Predictive aspects ==
In a longitudinal evaluation of the NHANES study, a large sample of the general US population, over 10 years, reduced SPINA-DI, calculated as the product of SPINA-GBeta times SPINA-GR, significantly predicted all-cause mortality.

== See also ==
- SPINA-GBeta
- SPINA-GD
- SPINA-GT
- Homeostatic model assessment
- QUICKI
