= Micromegaly =

Micromegaly is a term sometimes used to describe a state with abnormal, elevated insulin-like growth factor 1 levels and normal growth hormone levels (with correct suppression during an oral glucose tolerance test). In typical acromegaly disease scenario both insulin-like growth factor 1 levels and growth hormone levels are elevated (growth hormone is not suppressed correctly during an oral glucose tolerance test). Such abnormalities in the insulin-like growth factor 1 levels can be caused by pituitary microadenoma.
