= SPINA-GBeta =

Calculated biomarker

- Reference range: 0.64–3.73 pmol/s
- Purpose: Medical diagnosis, research
- Test of: Pancreatic beta cell function
- https://doi.org/10.5281/zenodo.7479856 https://doi.org/10.5281/zenodo.15249620

SPINA-GBeta is a calculated biomarker for pancreatic beta cell function. (Note: SPINA is an acronym for "structure parameter inference approach".) It represents the maximum amount of insulin that beta cells can produce per time-unit (e.g. in one second).

The method of calculation is based on a time-discrete nonlinear feedback model of insulin-glucose homeostasis that is rooted in the MiMe-NoCoDI modeling platform for endocrine systems.

== How to determine G_{Beta} ==
The index is derived from a mathematical model of insulin-glucose homeostasis that incorporates fundamental physiological motifs. For diagnostic purposes, it is calculated from fasting insulin and glucose concentrations with:

${\widehat{G}}_{\beta }=\frac{[I](\infty )({D}_{\beta }+\left[G\right](\infty ))}{{G}_{3}[G](\infty )}$.

[I](∞): Fasting Insulin plasma concentration (mol/L)
[G](∞): Fasting blood glucose concentration (mol/L)
D_{β}: EC_{50} for glucose at beta cells (7 mmol/L)
G_{3}: Parameter for pharmacokinetics (58,8 s/L)

== Clinical significance ==
=== Validity ===
SPINA-GBeta significantly correlates with the M value in glucose clamp studies and (better than HOMA-Beta) with the two-hour value in oral glucose tolerance testing (OGTT), glucose rise in OGTT, subscapular skinfold, truncal fat content and the HbA1c fraction.

It has the additional advantage that it circumvents the HOMA-blind zone, which renders the calculation of HOMA-Beta impossible if the fasting glucose concentration is 3.5 mmol/L (63 mg/dL) or below. Unlike HOMA-Beta, SPINA-Beta can be sensibly calculated in the whole range of measurements.

=== Reliability ===
In repeated measurements, SPINA-GBeta had higher retest reliability than HOMA-Beta, a measurement for beta cell function from the homeostasis model assessment.

=== Clinical utility ===
In the FAST study, an observational case-control sequencing study including 300 persons from Germany, SPINA-GBeta differed more clearly between subjects with and without diabetes than the corresponding HOMA-Beta index.

== Scientific implications and other uses ==
SPINA-Beta significantly correlates with biomarkers for the allostatic load. The direction is positive, i. e., higher allostatic load is associated with higher beta cell function. This is probably due to increased beta cell mass as a result of dynamical compensation.

Together with the reconstructed insulin receptor gain (SPINA-GR), SPINA-GBeta provides the foundation for the definition of a fasting based disposition index of insulin-glucose homeostasis (SPINA-DI).

In combination with SPINA-GR and whole-exome sequencing, calculating SPINA-GBeta helped to identify a new form of monogenetic diabetes (MODY) that is characterised by primary insulin resistance and results from a missense variant of the type 2 ryanodine receptor (RyR2) gene (p.N2291D).

== Pathophysiological implications ==
In several populations, SPINA-GBeta correlated with the area under the glucose curve and 2-hour concentrations of glucose, insulin and proinsulin in oral glucose tolerance testing, concentrations of free fatty acids, ghrelin and adiponectin, and the HbA1c fraction.

SPINA-GBeta declines with increasing adherence to mediterranean diet, which has been explained with a reduction in the chronic stimulus for dynamical compensation, i.e. insulin hypersecretion.

In hidradenitis suppurativa, an inflammatory skin disease, SPINA-GBeta is increased to compensate for reduced insulin sensitivity. This dynamical compensation is insufficient, however, in a subset of affected patients, resulting in a reduced static disposition index (SPINA-DI) and the onset of diabetes mellitus.

It was observed that piglets born to hyperglycaemic mother pigs had increased SPINA-GBeta, which may be a compensatory mechanism for simultaneously reduced SPINA-GR. The compensation is incomplete in this situation, however, as demonstrated by reduced SPINA-DI. This association could explain the increased risk of developing diabetes mellitus in the offspring of mothers with gestational diabetes (type 4 diabetes mellitus).

Since SPINA-GBeta has higher predictive power than HOMA-Beta, its use has been suggested as a calculated early biomarker for the evolution and pathophysiology of gestational diabetes.

== Predictive aspects ==
In a longitudinal evaluation of the NHANES study, a large sample of the general US population, over 10 years, reduced SPINA-GBeta significantly predicted all-cause mortality.

== See also ==
- SPINA-GR
- SPINA-GD
- SPINA-GT
- Homeostatic model assessment
- QUICKI
