= Prediabetes =

Predisease state of hyperglycemia

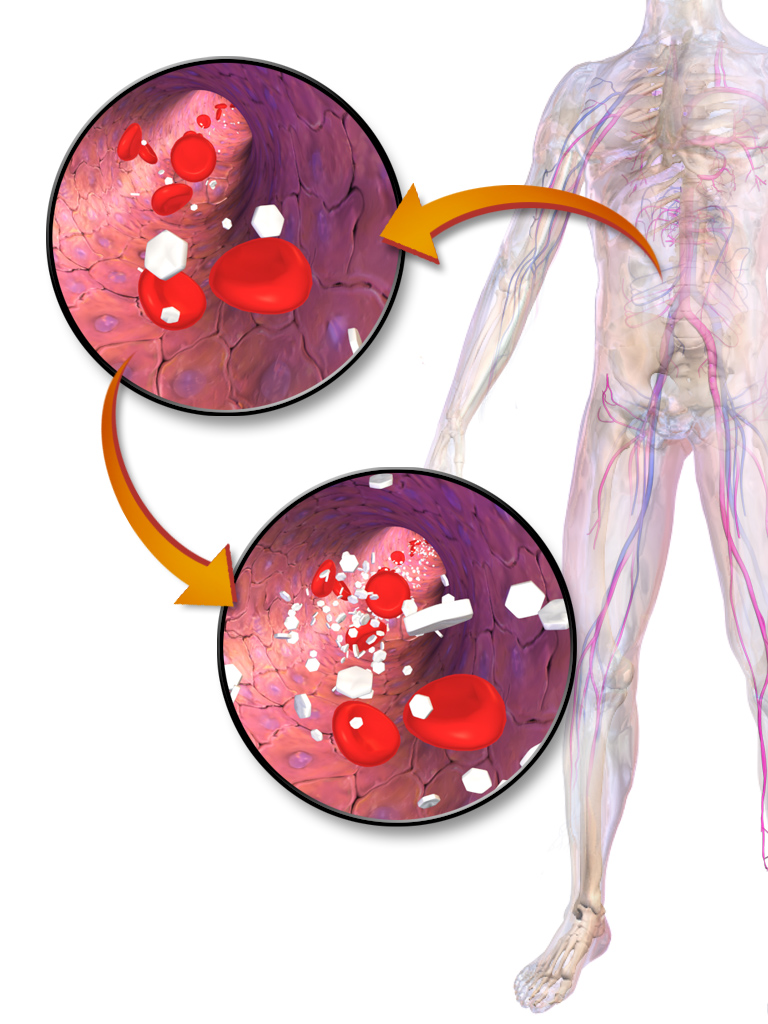
- White hexagons in the image represent glucose molecules, which are increased in the lower image. Hyperglycemia is the only major sign of prediabetes.
- Specialty: Endocrinology
- Complications: Diabetic complications

Prediabetes is a component of metabolic syndrome and is characterized by elevated blood sugar levels that fall below the threshold to diagnose diabetes mellitus. It usually does not cause symptoms, but people with prediabetes often have obesity (especially abdominal or visceral obesity), dyslipidemia with high triglycerides and/or low HDL cholesterol, and hypertension. It is also associated with increased risk for cardiovascular disease (CVD). Prediabetes is more accurately considered an early stage of diabetes, as health complications associated with type 2 diabetes often occur before the diagnosis of diabetes.

Prediabetes can be diagnosed by measuring hemoglobin A1c, fasting glucose, or glucose tolerance test. Many people may be diagnosed through routine screening tests. The primary treatment approach includes lifestyle changes such as exercise and dietary adjustments. Some medications can be used to reduce the risks associated with prediabetes. There is a high rate of progression to type 2 diabetes but this does not develop for everyone with prediabetes. Prediabetes can be a reversible condition with lifestyle changes.

For many people, prediabetes and diabetes are diagnosed through a routine screening at a check-up. The earlier prediabetes is diagnosed, the more likely an intervention will be successful.

== Signs and symptoms ==
Prediabetes typically has no distinct signs or symptoms except the sole sign of high blood sugar. People with prediabetes should monitor for signs and symptoms of type 2 diabetes such as increased thirst, increased urination, and feeling tired.

== Causes ==
The cause of prediabetes is multifactorial and is known to have contributions from lifestyle and genetic factors. Ultimately prediabetes occurs when control of insulin and blood glucose in the body becomes abnormal, also known as insulin resistance. Risk factors for developing prediabetes include being overweight or obese, physical inactivity, an unhealthy diet, a family history of diabetes, having a genetic predisposition to prediabetes or diabetes, older age, and women who have a history of gestational diabetes or of giving birth to high birth weight infants (greater than 9 pounds or 4.1 kg).

The increasing rates of prediabetes and diabetes suggest that lifestyle and/or environmental factors contribute to prediabetes. It remains unclear which dietary components are causative and risk is likely influenced by genetic background. Increasing physical activity and following a healthy diet can reduce the risk of progressing to type 2 diabetes.

== Pathophysiology ==
Normal glucose homeostasis is controlled by three interrelated processes. These processes include gluconeogenesis (glucose production that occurs in the liver), uptake and utilization of glucose by the peripheral tissues of the body, and insulin secretion by the pancreatic beta islet cells. The presence of glucose in the bloodstream triggers the production and release of insulin from the pancreas' beta islet cells. The main function of insulin is to increase the rate of transport of glucose from the bloodstream into certain cells of the body, such as striated muscles, fibroblasts, and fat cells. It also is necessary for transport of amino acids, glycogen formation in the liver and skeletal muscles, triglyceride formation from glucose, nucleic acid synthesis, and protein synthesis. In individuals with prediabetes, a failure of pancreatic hormone release, failure of targeted tissues to respond to the insulin present or both leads to blood glucose rises to abnormally high levels.

== Diagnosis ==
Prediabetes can be diagnosed with three different types of blood tests:

- Fasting blood sugar (glucose) level of:
  - 110 to 125 mg/dL (6.1 mmol/L to 6.9 mmol/L) – WHO criteria
  - 100 to 125 mg/dL (5.6 mmol/L to 6.9 mmol/L) – ADA criteria
- Glucose tolerance test: blood sugar level of 140 to 199 mg/dL (7.8 to 11.0 mM) 2 hours after ingesting a standardized 75 gram glucose solution (WHO and ADA criteria)
- Glycated hemoglobin (HbA1c) between 5.7 and 6.4 percent, i.e., 38.9 and 46.4 mmol/mol

Levels above these limits would justify a diagnosis for diabetes.

=== Impaired fasting glucose ===
Impaired fasting glycemia or impaired fasting glucose (IFG) refers to a condition in which the fasting blood glucose is elevated above what is considered normal levels but is not high enough to be classified as diabetes mellitus. It is considered a pre-diabetic state, associated with insulin resistance and increased risk of cardiovascular pathology, although of lesser risk than impaired glucose tolerance (IGT). IFG sometimes progresses to type 2 diabetes mellitus.

Fasting blood glucose levels are in a continuum within a given population, with higher fasting glucose levels corresponding to a higher risk for complications caused by the high glucose levels. Some patients with impaired fasting glucose also may be diagnosed with impaired glucose tolerance, but many have normal responses to a glucose tolerance test. Fasting glucose is helpful in identifying prediabetes when positive but has a risk of false negatives.

World Health Organization (WHO) criteria for impaired fasting glucose differs from the American Diabetes Association (ADA) criteria, because the normal range of glucose is defined differently by each. Fasting plasma glucose levels 100 mg/dL (5.5 mmol/L) and higher have been shown to increase complication rates significantly, however, WHO opted to keep its upper limit of normal at under 110 mg/dL for fear of causing too many people to be diagnosed as having impaired fasting glucose, whereas the ADA lowered the upper limit of normal to a fasting plasma glucose under 100 mg/dL.

- WHO criteria: fasting plasma glucose level from 6.1 mmol/L (110 mg/dL) to 6.9 mmol/L (125 mg/dL)
- ADA criteria: fasting plasma glucose level from 5.6 mmol/L (100 mg/dL) to 6.9 mmol/L (125 mg/dL)

=== Impaired glucose tolerance ===
Impaired glucose tolerance (IGT) is diagnosed with an oral glucose tolerance test. According to the criteria of the World Health Organization and the American Diabetes Association, impaired glucose tolerance is defined as:

- two-hour glucose levels of 140 to 199 mg per dL (7.8 to 11.0 mmol/L) on the 75-g oral glucose tolerance test. A patient is said to be under the condition of IGT when he/she has an intermediately raised glucose level after 2 hours, but less than the level that would qualify for type 2 diabetes mellitus. The fasting glucose may be either normal or mildly elevated.

From 10 to 15 percent of adults in the United States have impaired glucose tolerance or impaired fasting glucose.

=== Hemoglobin A1c ===
Hemoglobin A1c is a measure of the percent of red blood cells that are glycated, or have a glucose molecule attached. This can be used as an indicator of blood glucose level over a longer period of time and is often used to diagnose prediabetes as well as diabetes. HbA1c may not accurately represent blood glucose levels and should not be used in certain medical conditions such as iron-deficiency anemia, Vitamin B12 and folate deficiency, pregnancy, hemolytic anemia, an enlarged spleen, and end-stage kidney failure.

=== Fasting insulin ===
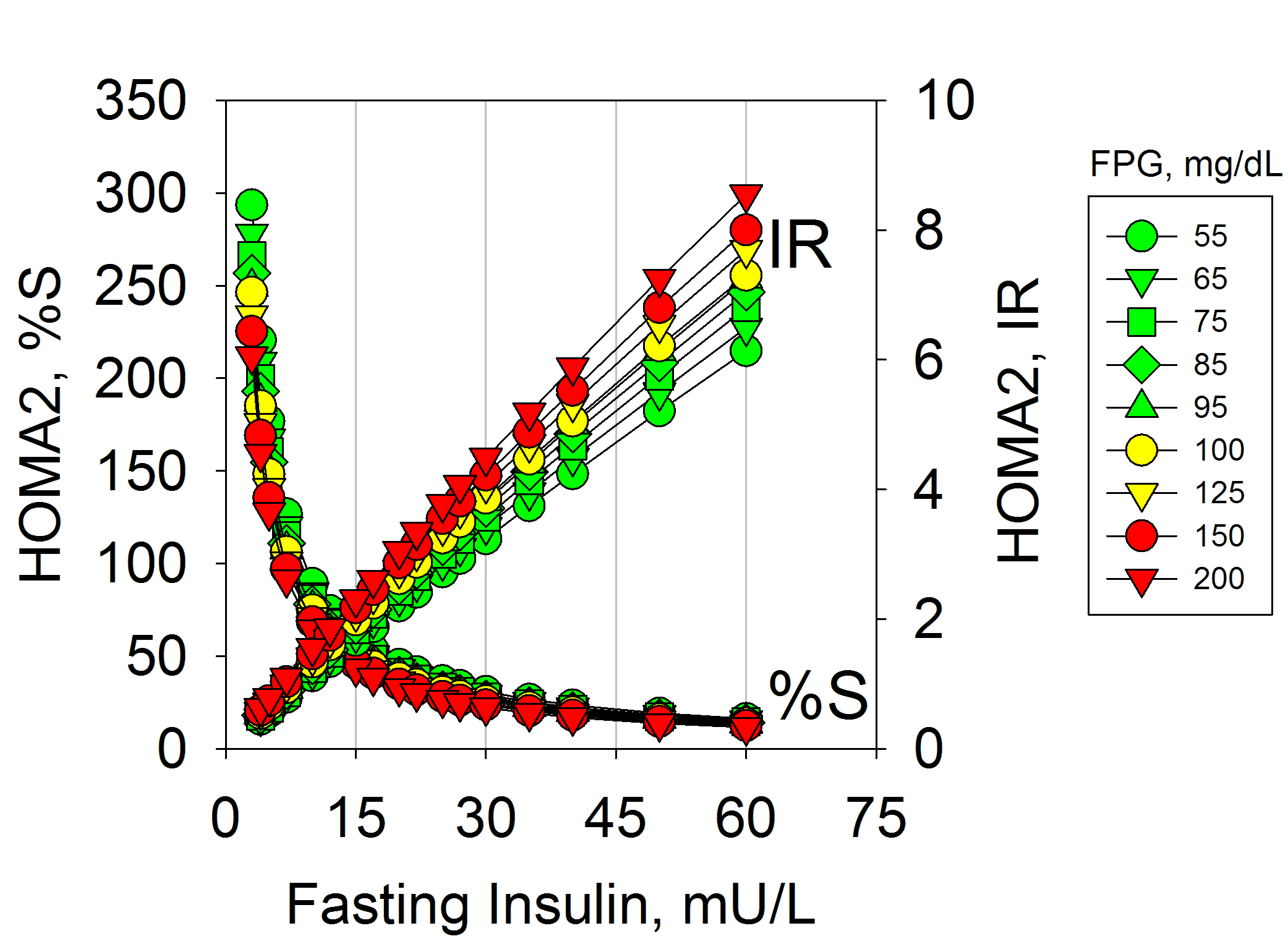
Estimate of insulin resistance (IR) and insulin sensitivity (%S) according to the Homeostatic model assessment (HOMA). Patterns were modeled as a function of fasting plasma insulin and varying fasting plasma glucose. Calculated using HOMA Calculator. Adapted from

Hyperinsulinemia due to insulin resistance may occur in individuals with normal glucose levels and therefore is not diagnosed with usual tests. Hyperinsulinemia precedes prediabetes and diabetes that are characterized by hyperglycemia. Insulin resistance can be diagnosed by measures of plasma insulin, both fasting or during a glucose tolerance test. The use of fasting insulin to identify patients at risk has been proposed, but is currently not commonly used in clinical practice.

The implications of hyperinsulinemia is the risk of comorbidities related to diabetes that may precede changes in blood glucose, including cardiovascular diseases.

== Screening ==
Fasting plasma glucose screening should begin at age 30–45 and be repeated at least every three years. Earlier and more frequent screening should be conducted in at-risk individuals. The risk factors for which are listed below:

- Family history (parent or sibling)
- Dyslipidemia (triglycerides > 200 mg/dL or HDL < 35 mg/dL)
- Overweight or obesity (body mass index > 25 kg/m2)
- History of gestational diabetes or infant born with birth weight greater than 9 lb (4 kg)
- High risk ethnic group (such as of being of African American, Hispanic, Native American, Asian American or Pacific Islander heritage)
- Hypertension (systolic blood pressure >140 mmHg or diastolic blood pressure > 90 mmHg)
- Prior fasting blood glucose > 99 mg/dL
- Known vascular disease
- Markers of insulin resistance (polyendocrine metabolic ovarian syndrome (PMOS), acanthosis nigricans)

The United States Preventative Services Task Force (USPSTF) recommends adults who are overweight/obese and aged 40–70 years old to get screened during visits to their regular physician. The American Diabetes Association (ADA) recommends normal testing repeated every three years and recommends a larger range of people get tested: anyone over the age of 45 regardless of risk; an adult of any age who is obese or overweight and has one or more risk factors, which includes hypertension, a first degree relative with diabetes, physical inactivity, high risk race/ethnicity, Asian Americans with BMI of ≥23 kg/m^{2}, HDL < 35 mg/dL or TG > 250 mg/dL, women who have delivered child >9 lbs or with gestational diabetes, A1c ≥ 5.7%, impaired fasting glucose (IFG) or impaired glucose tolerance (IGT).

In the UK, NICE guidelines suggest taking action to prevent diabetes for people with a body mass index (BMI) of 30. For people of Black African, African-Caribbean, South Asian and Chinese descent the recommendation to start prevention starts at the BMI of 27.5. A study based on a large sample of people in England suggest even lower BMIs for certain ethnic groups for the start of prevention, for example 24 in South Asian and 21 in Bangladeshi populations.

=== Early detection and management ===
Over half the people who are diagnosed with prediabetes eventually develop type 2 diabetes and once diagnosed with prediabetes, people experience a range of emotions: distress and fear; denial and downplay of risks; guilt and self-criticism; and self-compassion. While prediabetes is a reversible condition, it requires diet change and exercise, which may be more difficult for people diagnosed prediabetes because facing the risk of a chronic condition is associated with negative emotions, which further hinder the self-regulation that is required in reversing a prediabetes diagnosis. Still, without taking action, 37% of individuals with prediabetes will develop diabetes in only 4 years, and lifestyle intervention may decrease the percentage of prediabetic patients in whom diabetes develops to 20%. The National Diabetes Prevention Program (DPP) has a Center of Disease Control (CDC)-recognized lifestyle change program that showed prediabetic people following the structured program can cut their risk of developing type 2 diabetes by 58% (71% for people over 60 years old). Considering the possibility to recover from the prediabetic status but also this emotional struggle upon diagnosis, it is encouraged for higher risk patients to get tested early. Having an additional screening option in the dental setting may offset some of the emotional struggle because it is more regularly visited and therefore has the potential to initiate earlier recognition and intervention.

== Prevention ==
The American College of Endocrinology (ACE) and the American Association of Clinical Endocrinologists (AACE) have developed lifestyle intervention guidelines for preventing the onset of type 2 diabetes:

- Healthy diet (a diet with limited refined carbohydrates, added sugars, trans fats, as well as limited intake of sodium and total calories)
- Physical fitness (30–45 minutes of cardiovascular exercise per day, 3–5 days a week)
- Weight loss by as little as 5–10 percent may have a significant impact on overall health

== Management ==
Prediabetes is a curable disease state, and people can routinely return to normoglycemia (normal glucose metabolism) with interventions. Although some drugs can delay the onset of diabetes, lifestyle modifications play a greater role in the prevention of diabetes. Intensive weight loss and lifestyle intervention, if sustained, may improve glucose tolerance substantially and prevent progression from IGT to type 2 diabetes. The Diabetes Prevention Program (DPP) study found a 16% reduction in diabetes risk for every kilogram of weight loss. Reducing weight by 7% through a low-fat diet and performing 150 minutes of exercise a week is the goal. The ADA guidelines recommend modest weight loss (5–10% body weight), moderate-intensity exercise (30 minutes daily), and smoking cessation.

There are many dietary approaches that can reduce the risk of progression to diabetes. Most involve the reduction of added sugars and fats but there remains a lack of conclusive evidence proving the best approach.

For patients with severe risk factors, prescription medication may be appropriate. The American Diabetes Association recommends that prescription medications may be considered for those with prediabetes, including those in a specific subgroup who are more likely to have a greater benefit from medications and are at a higher risk of progressing to diabetes. This subgroup of people includes those with a BMI greater than 35, age less than 60, women with a history of gestational diabetes, a fasting plasma glucose greater than 110 or an A1c greater than 6%. This may also be considered in patients for whom lifestyle therapy has failed, or is not sustainable, who are at high-risk for developing type 2 diabetes, or who prefer to take a medication. Metformin and acarbose help prevent the development of prediabetes, and also have a good safety profile. Evidence also supports thiazolidinediones but there are safety concerns, and data on newer agents such as GLP-1 receptor agonists, DPP4 inhibitors or meglitinides are lacking.

== Prognosis ==
The progression to type 2 diabetes mellitus is not inevitable for those with prediabetes. The progression into diabetes mellitus from prediabetes is approximately 25% over three to five years. This increases to 50% risk of progressing to diabetes over 10 years. Diabetes is a leading cause of morbidity and mortality. Effects of the disease may affect larger blood vessels (e.g., atherosclerosis within the larger arteries of the cardiovascular system) or smaller blood vessels, as seen with damage to the retina of the eye, damage to the kidney, and damage to the nerves.

Prediabetes is a risk factor for mortality and there is evidence of cardiovascular disease developing prior to a diagnosis of diabetes.

== Epidemiology ==
The prevalence of prediabetes worldwide is expected to increase. In 2021, 720 million people worldwide had prediabetes, and this is estimated to increase to 1 billion people by 2045. Other sources estimate that the worldwide prevalence of prediabetes will increase to 11% by 2045. In the United States, 38% of all adults have prediabetes. In the United States, the prevalence rates of prediabetes are similar across ethnicities.

The incidence of diabetes is also growing. In 2014, 29.1 million people or 9% of the US population had diabetes. In 2011–2012, the prevalence of diabetes in the U.S. using hemoglobin A1C, fasting plasma glucose or the two-hour plasma glucose definition was 14% for total diabetes, 9% for diagnosed diabetes, 5% for undiagnosed diabetes and 38% for prediabetes.

== Research directions ==
=== Continuous glucose monitoring ===
The clinical role of continuous glucose monitoring (CGM) is unclear. Comparing results of CGM studies is problematic as study parameters are non-standardized. The IFCC supported a review to provide recommendations that encourage developing standards for CGM performance studies.

== See also ==
- Metabolic syndrome
- Diabetes
- Insulin resistance
- Cardiovascular disease
