= Blood sugar regulation =

Hormones regulating blood sugar levels

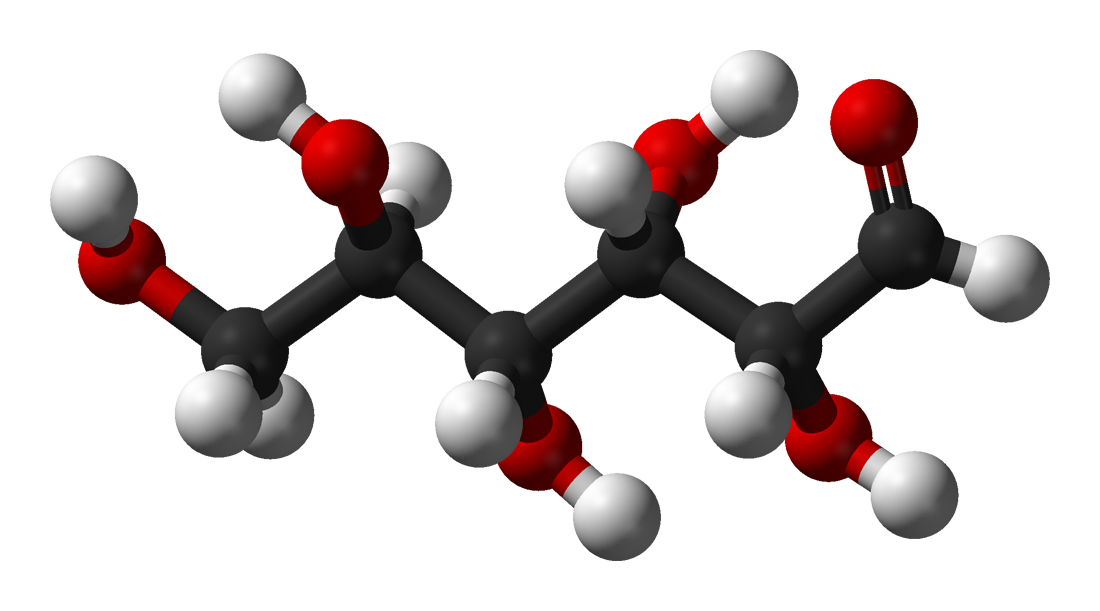
Ball-and-stick model of a glucose molecule

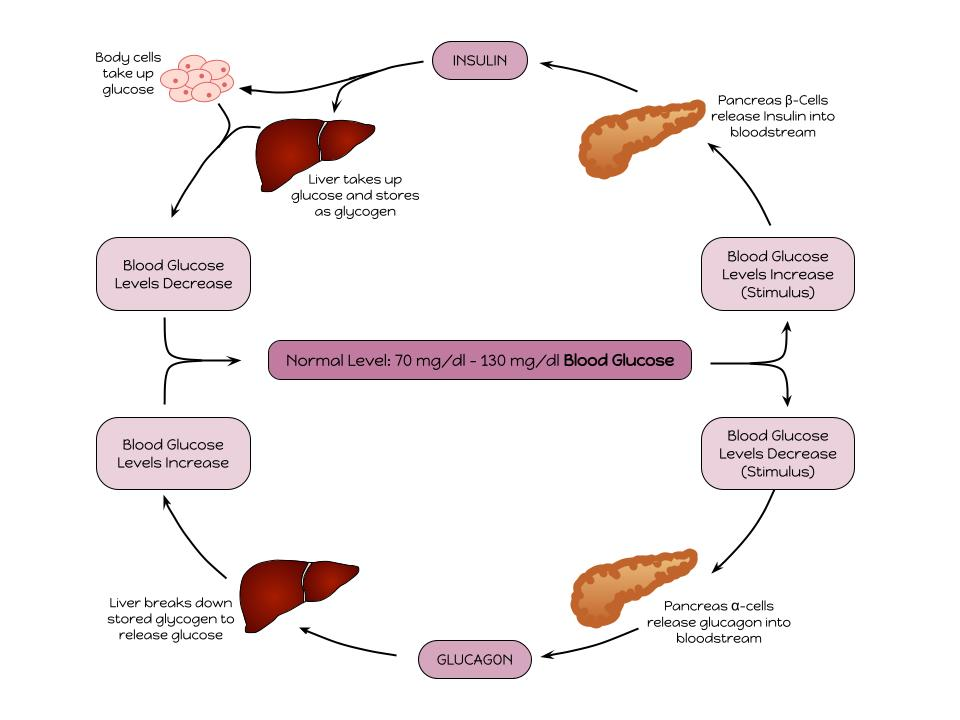
The regulation of glucose levels through Homeostasis

Blood sugar regulation is the process by which the level of blood sugar, the common name for glucose dissolved in blood plasma, is maintained by the body within a narrow range.

This tight regulation is referred to as glucose homeostasis. Insulin, which lowers blood sugar, and glucagon, which raises it, are the most well known of the hormones involved, but more recent discoveries of other glucoregulatory hormones have expanded understanding of this process. The pancreas gland secretes two hormones that are primarily responsible for regulation of glucose levels in blood.

== Mechanisms ==
The flat line is the optimal blood sugar level (i.e. the homeostatic set point). Blood sugar levels are balanced by the tug-of-war between 2 functionally opposite hormones, glucagon and insulin.

Blood sugar levels are regulated by negative feedback in order to keep the body in balance. The levels of glucose in the blood are monitored by many tissues, but the cells in the pancreatic islets are among the most well understood and important.

Granule docking is an important glucose-dependent step in human insulin secretion that does not work properly in type 2 diabetes.

=== Glucagon ===
If the blood glucose level falls to dangerously low levels (as during very heavy exercise or lack of food for extended periods), the alpha cells of the pancreas release glucagon, a peptide hormone which travels through the blood to the liver, where it binds to glucagon receptors on the surface of liver cells and stimulates them to break down glycogen stored inside the cells into glucose (this process is called glycogenolysis). The cells release the glucose into the bloodstream, increasing blood sugar levels. Hypoglycemia, the state of having low blood sugar, is treated by restoring the blood glucose level to normal by the ingestion or administration of dextrose or carbohydrate foods. It is often self-diagnosed and self-medicated orally by the ingestion of balanced meals. In more severe circumstances, it is treated by injection or infusion of glucagon.

=== Insulin ===
When levels of blood sugar rise, whether as a result of glycogen conversion, or from digestion of a meal, a different hormone is released from beta cells found in the islets of Langerhans in the pancreas. This hormone, insulin, causes the liver to convert more glucose into glycogen (this process is called glycogenesis), and to force about 2/3 of body cells (primarily muscle and fat tissue cells) to take up glucose from the blood through the GLUT4 transporter, thus decreasing blood sugar. When insulin binds to the receptors on the cell surface, vesicles containing the GLUT4 transporters come to the plasma membrane and fuse together by the process of endocytosis, thus enabling a facilitated diffusion of glucose into the cell. As soon as the glucose enters the cell, it is phosphorylated into glucose-6-phosphate in order to preserve the concentration gradient so glucose will continue to enter the cell. Insulin also provides signals to several other body systems, and is the chief regulator of metabolic control in humans.

There are also several other causes for an increase in blood sugar levels. Among them are the 'stress' hormones such as epinephrine (also known as adrenaline), several of the steroids, infections, trauma, and of course, the ingestion of food.

Diabetes mellitus type 1 is caused by insufficient or non-existent production of insulin, while type 2 is primarily due to a decreased response to insulin in the tissues of the body (insulin resistance). Both types of diabetes, if untreated, result in too much glucose remaining in the blood (hyperglycemia) and many of the same complications. Also, too much insulin and/or exercise without enough corresponding food intake in diabetics can result in low blood sugar (hypoglycemia).

== Hormones that influence blood glucose level ==
Hormone	Tissue of origin	Metabolic effect	Effect on blood glucose
Insulin	Pancreatic β Cells	1) Enhances entry of glucose into cells; 2) Enhances storage of glucose as glycogen, or conversion to fatty acids; 3) Enhances synthesis of fatty acids and proteins; 4) Suppresses breakdown of proteins into amino acids, and Triglycerides (from adipose tissue) into free fatty acids.	Lowers
Amylin	Pancreatic β Cells	1) Suppresses glucagon secretion after eating; 2) Slows gastric emptying; 3) Reduces food intake.	Lowers
GLP-1	Intestinal L cells	1) Enhances glucose-dependent insulin secretion; 2) Suppresses glucagon secretion after eating; 3) Slows gastric emptying; 4) Reduces food intake. (Only works while food is in the gut)	Lowers
GIP	Intestinal K cells	1) Induces insulin secretion; 2) Inhibits apoptosis of the pancreatic beta cells and promotes their proliferation; 3) Stimulates glucagon secretion and fat accumulation	Lowers
Glucagon	Pancreatic α Cells	1) Enhances release of glucose from glycogen (glycogenolysis); 2) Enhances synthesis of glucose (gluconeogenesis) from amino acids or fats.	Raises
Asprosin	White adipose tissue	1) Enhances release of liver glucose during fasting.	Raises
Somatostatin	Pancreatic δ Cells	1) Suppresses glucagon release from α cells (acts locally); 2) Suppresses release of Insulin, Pituitary tropic hormones, gastrin and secretin; 3) Decreases stomach acid production by preventing the release of other hormones (gastrin and histamine), thus slowing down the digestive process.	Lowers
Epinephrine	Adrenal medulla	1) Enhances release of glucose from glycogen; 2) Enhances release of fatty acids from adipose tissue.	Raises
Cortisol	Adrenal cortex	1) Enhances gluconeogenesis; 2) Antagonizes insulin.	Raises
ACTH	Anterior pituitary	1) Enhances release of cortisol; 2) Enhances release of fatty acids from adipose tissue.	Raises
Growth hormone	Anterior pituitary	Antagonizes insulin	Raises
Thyroxine	Thyroid	1) Enhances release of glucose from glycogen; 2) Enhances absorption of sugars from intestine.	Raises

== Carbohydrate control in invertebrates ==
Insects have two types of "blood sugar", the monosaccharide glucose and the disaccharide trehalose. Trehalose is the major carbohydrate used by insects for flight.

The concentrations of the carbohydrates trehalose and glucose in the insect hemolymph are tightly controlled by multiple enzymes and hormones, including trehalase, insulin-like peptides (ILPs and DILPs), adipokinetic hormone (AKH), leucokinin (LK), octopamine and other mediators, thereby maintaining carbohydrate homeostasis by endocrine and metabolic feedback mechanisms.
