= Insulin resistance =

Failure of cells to respond appropriately to insulin

- Specialty: Endocrinology
- Complications: Nonalcoholic fatty liver disease, vascular disease.
- Duration: 10 to 15 years before developing type 2 diabetes.
- Causes: Lipotoxicity, use of glucocorticoids, anti-adrenergic, protease inhibitors, selective serotonin reuptake inhibitors, atypical antipsychotics.
- Risk factors: Hyperinsulinemia
- Diagnostic method: Glucose challenge test, Glucose clamp technique.
- Prognosis: Hyperglycemia, hypertension, dyslipidemia, hyperuricemia, elevated inflammatory markers, endothelial dysfunction, a prothrombotic state, and polyendocrine metabolic ovarian syndrome (PMOS).

Insulin resistance (IR) is a pathological response in which cells in insulin-sensitive tissues fail to respond normally to the hormone insulin or downregulate insulin receptors in response to hyperinsulinemia. Insulin resistance can cause prediabetes and type 2 diabetes.

Insulin is a hormone that facilitates the transport of glucose from blood into cells, thereby reducing blood glucose. Insulin is released by the pancreas in response to carbohydrates consumed in the diet. In states of insulin resistance, the same amount of insulin does not have the same effect on glucose transport and blood sugar levels. There are many causes of insulin resistance and the underlying process is still not completely understood. Risk factors for insulin resistance include obesity, sedentary lifestyle, family history of diabetes, various health conditions, and certain medications. Insulin resistance is considered a component of the metabolic syndrome. Insulin resistance can be improved or reversed with lifestyle approaches, such as weight reduction, exercise, and dietary changes.

Techniques to test for the presence or extent of insulin resistance include measurement of fasting insulin levels, the hyperinsulinemic euglycemic clamp technique, the modified insulin suppression test and static function tests. These methods are not often used in clinical practice.

== Cause ==
=== Risk factors ===
There are a number of risk factors for insulin resistance, including being overweight or obese or having a sedentary lifestyle. Various genetic factors can increase risk, such as a family history of diabetes, and there are some specific medical conditions associated with insulin resistance, such as polyendocrine metabolic ovarian syndrome (PMOS).

The U.S. National Institute of Diabetes and Digestive and Kidney Diseases states that specific risks that may predispose an individual to insulin resistance can include:

- being aged 45 or older
- having African American, Alaska Native, American Indian, Asian American, Hispanic/Latino, Native Hawaiian, or Pacific Islander American ethnicity
- having health conditions such as high blood pressure and abnormal cholesterol levels
- having a history of gestational diabetes
- having a history of heart disease or stroke.

In addition, some medications and other health conditions can raise the risk.

=== Lifestyle factors ===
Dietary factors are likely to contribute to insulin resistance. However, causative foods are difficult to determine given the limitations of nutrition research. Foods that have independently been linked to insulin resistance include those high in salt and sugar with high glycemic indices, low in omega-3 and fiber, and which are hyperpalatable which increases risk of overeating. Overconsumption of fat- and sugar-rich meals and beverages have been proposed as a fundamental factor behind the metabolic syndrome epidemic.

Diet also has the potential to change the ratio of polyunsaturated to saturated phospholipids in cell membranes. The percentage of polyunsaturated fatty acids (PUFAs) is inversely correlated with insulin resistance. It is hypothesized that increasing cell membrane fluidity by increasing PUFA concentration might result in an enhanced number of insulin receptors, an increased affinity of insulin to its receptors, and reduced insulin resistance.

Vitamin D deficiency has also been associated with insulin resistance.

Sedentary lifestyle increases the likelihood of the development of insulin resistance. In epidemiological studies, higher levels of physical activity (more than 90 minutes per day) reduce the risk of diabetes by 28%.

Studies have consistently shown that there is a link between insulin resistance and circadian rhythm, with insulin sensitivity being higher in the morning and lower in the evening. A mismatch between the circadian rhythm and the meals schedule, such as in circadian rhythm disorders, may increase insulin resistance.

Insufficient sleep has been shown to cause insulin resistance, and also increases the risk of developing metabolic diseases such as type 2 diabetes and obesity.

=== Medications ===
Some medications are associated with insulin resistance, including corticosteroids, SSRIs, protease inhibitors (a type of HIV medication), and atypical antipsychotics.

=== Hormones ===
Many hormones can induce insulin resistance including cortisol, growth hormone, and human placental lactogen.

Cortisol counteracts insulin and can lead to increased hepatic gluconeogenesis, reduced peripheral utilization of glucose, and increased insulin resistance. It does this by decreasing the translocation of glucose transporters (especially GLUT4) to the cell membrane.

Based on the significant improvement in insulin sensitivity in humans after bariatric surgery and rats with surgical removal of the duodenum, it has been proposed that some substance is produced in the mucosa of that initial portion of the small intestine that signals body cells to become insulin resistant. If the producing tissue is removed, the signal ceases and body cells revert to normal insulin sensitivity. No such substance has been found as yet, and the existence of such a substance remains speculative.

Leptin is a hormone produced from the ob gene and adipocytes. Its physiological role is to regulate hunger by alerting the body when it is full. Studies show that lack of leptin causes severe obesity and is strongly linked with insulin resistance.

=== Diseases ===
Polyendocrine metabolic ovarian syndrome (PMOS) and metabolic dysfunction–associated steatotic liver disease (MASLD) are associated with insulin resistance. Hepatitis C also makes people three to four times more likely to develop type 2 diabetes and insulin resistance.

=== Inflammation ===
Elevated inflammatory markers, such as C-reactive protein and increased white blood cell count, are associated with insulin resistance.

=== Genetics ===
Several genetic loci have been identified as associated with insulin insensitivity. These include variations in loci near the NAT2, GCKR, and IGFI genes, which are linked to insulin resistance. Further research has indicated that loci near these genes are correlated with insulin resistance. However, it is estimated that these loci only account for 25–44% of the genetic component of insulin resistance.

== Pathophysiology ==
In normal metabolism, the elevated blood glucose level causes beta (β) cells in the Islets of Langerhans, located in the pancreas, to release insulin into the blood. The insulin makes insulin-sensitive tissues in the body (primarily skeletal muscle cells, adipose tissue, and liver) absorb glucose which provides energy as well as lowers blood glucose, in a negative feedback loop. The beta cells reduce insulin output as the blood glucose level falls, allowing blood glucose to settle at a homeostatic constant level of approximately 5 mmol/L (90 mg/dL). In an insulin-resistant individual, normal levels of insulin do not have the same effect in controlling blood glucose levels.

When the body produces insulin under conditions of insulin resistance, the cells are unable to absorb or use glucose as effectively and it stays in the bloodstream. Certain cell types such as fat and muscle cells require insulin to absorb glucose and when these cells fail to respond adequately to circulating insulin, blood glucose levels rise. Skeletal muscle is thought to be particularly important in this regard. The liver normally helps regulate glucose levels by reducing its secretion of glucose in the presence of insulin. However, in insulin resistance, this normal reduction in the liver's glucose production may not occur, further contributing to elevated blood glucose. Also, insulin resistance often is associated with a hypercoagulable state (impaired fibrinolysis) and increased inflammatory cytokine levels. Insulin resistance within skeletal muscle is thought to play a major role in the development of insulin resistance in the whole body.

=== Pancreas ===
In states of insulin resistance, beta cells in the pancreas increase their production of insulin. This causes high blood insulin (hyperinsulinemia) to compensate for the high blood glucose. During this compensated phase of insulin resistance, beta cell function is upregulated, insulin levels are higher, and blood glucose levels are still maintained. If compensatory insulin secretion fails, then either fasting (impaired fasting glucose) or postprandial (impaired glucose tolerance) glucose concentrations increase. Eventually, type 2 diabetes occurs when glucose levels become higher as the resistance increases and compensatory insulin secretion fails. The inability of the β-cells to produce sufficient insulin in a condition of hyperglycemia is what characterizes the transition from insulin resistance to type 2 diabetes.

=== Adipose tissue ===
Insulin resistance in fat cells results in reduced uptake of circulating lipids and increased hydrolysis of stored triglycerides. This leads to elevated free fatty acids in the blood plasma and can further worsen insulin resistance. Since insulin is the primary hormonal signal for energy storage into fat cells, which tend to retain their sensitivity in the face of hepatic and skeletal muscle resistance, insulin resistance stimulates the formation of new fatty tissue and accelerates weight gain.

Insulin resistance is strongly associated with intestinal-derived apoB-48 production rate in insulin-resistant subjects and people with type 2 diabetes. Insulin resistance often is found in people with visceral adiposity, hypertension, hyperglycemia, and dyslipidemia involving elevated triglycerides, small dense low-density lipoprotein (sdLDL) particles, and decreased high-density lipoprotein (HDL) cholesterol levels. With respect to visceral adiposity, a great deal of evidence suggests two strong links with insulin resistance. First, unlike subcutaneous adipose tissue, visceral adipose cells produce significant amounts of proinflammatory cytokines such as tumor necrosis factor-alpha (TNF-a), and interleukins-1 and -6. In numerous experimental models, these proinflammatory cytokines disrupt normal insulin action in fat and muscle cells and may be a major factor in causing the whole-body insulin resistance observed in patients with visceral adiposity. Much of the attention on production of proinflammatory cytokines has focused on the IKK-beta/NF-kappa-B pathway, a protein network that enhances transcription of inflammatory markers and mediators that may cause insulin resistance. Second, visceral adiposity is related to an accumulation of fat in the liver, a condition known as metabolic dysfunction–associated steatotic liver disease (NAFLD). The result of NAFLD is an excessive release of free fatty acids into the bloodstream (due to increased lipolysis), and an increase in hepatic breakdown of glycogen stores into glucose (glycogenolysis), both of which have the effect of exacerbating peripheral insulin resistance and increasing the likelihood of Type 2 diabetes mellitus.

The excessive expansion of adipose tissue that tends to occur under a sustained positive energy balance (as in overeating) has been postulated by Vidal-Puig to induce lipotoxic and inflammatory effects that may contribute to causing insulin resistance and its accompanying disease states.

=== Brain ===
Brain cells also require insulin, such that insulin resistance in the brain is implicated in neurodegenerative disease. (Although insulin does not cross the blood-brain barrier natively, it can do so by carrier-mediated transport systems.)

=== Molecular mechanism ===
At the molecular level, a cell senses insulin through insulin receptors, with the signal propagating through the insulin signal transduction pathway. Recent studies suggested that the pathway may operate as a bistable switch under physiologic conditions for certain types of cells, and insulin response may well be a threshold phenomenon. The pathway's sensitivity to insulin may be blunted by many factors such as lipolysis of free fatty acids, causing insulin resistance. From a broader perspective, however, sensitivity tuning (including sensitivity reduction) is a common practice for an organism to adapt to the changing environment or metabolic conditions. Pregnancy, for example, entails significant metabolic changes, during which the mother must decrease the insulin sensitivity of her muscles to conserve more glucose for both the maternal and fetal brains. This adaptation can occur by elevating the response threshold, thereby delaying the onset of sensitivity. This is achieved through the secretion of placental growth factor, which interferes with the interaction between insulin receptor substrate (IRS) and PI3K. This concept forms the basis of the adjustable threshold hypothesis of insulin resistance.

Insulin resistance has been proposed to be a reaction to excess nutrition by superoxide dismutase in cell mitochondria that acts as an antioxidant defense mechanism. This link seems to exist under diverse causes of insulin resistance. It also is based on the finding that insulin resistance may be reversed rapidly by exposing cells to mitochondrial uncouplers, electron transport chain inhibitors, or mitochondrial superoxide dismutase mimetics.

== Diagnosis ==
=== Glucose tolerance testing ===
Glucose tolerance testing is not used to diagnose insulin resistance. However, it is used to diagnose diabetes mellitus. During a glucose tolerance test (GTT), a fasting patient takes a 75 gram oral dose of glucose. Then blood glucose levels are measured over the following two hours.

Interpretation is based on WHO guidelines. After two hours a glycemia less than 7.8 mmol/L (140 mg/dL) is considered normal, a glycemia of between 7.8 and 11.0 mmol/L (140 to 197 mg/dL) is considered as impaired glucose tolerance (IGT), and a glycemia of greater than or equal to 11.1 mmol/L (200 mg/dL) is considered diabetes mellitus.

An oral glucose tolerance test (OGTT) may be normal or mildly abnormal in simple insulin resistance. Often, there are raised glucose levels in the early measurements, reflecting the loss of a postprandial peak (after the meal) in insulin production. Extension of the testing (for several more hours) may reveal a hypoglycemic "dip," that is a result of an overshoot in insulin production after the failure of the physiologic postprandial insulin response.

=== Fasting insulin levels ===
A fasting serum insulin level greater than 29 microIU/mL or 174 pmol/L indicates insulin resistance. The same levels apply three hours after the last meal.

=== Hyperinsulinemic euglycemic clamp ===
The gold standard for investigating and quantifying insulin resistance is the "hyperinsulinemic euglycemic clamp," so-called because it measures the amount of glucose necessary to compensate for an increased insulin level without causing hypoglycemia. It is a type of glucose clamp technique. The test is rarely performed in clinical care, but is used in medical research, for example, to assess the effects of different medications. The rate of glucose infusion commonly is referred to in diabetes literature as the GINF value.

The procedure takes about two hours. Through a peripheral vein, insulin is infused at 10–120 mU per m^{2} per minute. In order to compensate for the insulin infusion, glucose 20% is infused to maintain blood sugar levels between 5 and 5.5 mmol/L. The rate of glucose infusion is determined by checking the blood sugar levels every five to ten minutes.

The insulin sensitivity is determined by the rate of glucose infusion during the last thirty minutes of the test. If high levels (7.5 mg/min or higher) are needed, the patient is considered insulin-sensitive. Conversely, very low levels (4.0 mg/min or lower) indicate insulin resistance. Levels falling between 4.0 and 7.5 mg/min are not conclusive and suggest "impaired glucose tolerance," which is an early indication of insulin resistance.

This fundamental technique can be greatly enhanced through the utilization of glucose tracers. Glucose can be labeled with either stable or radioactive atoms. Commonly employed tracers include 3-3H glucose (radioactive), 6,6 2H-glucose (stable), and 1-13C glucose (stable). Prior to initiating the hyperinsulinemic phase, a 3-hour tracer infusion allows for the determination of the basal rate of glucose production. Throughout the clamp, the plasma tracer concentrations facilitate the computation of whole-body insulin-stimulated glucose metabolism, as well as the production of glucose by the body. (i.e., endogenous glucose production).

=== Modified insulin suppression test ===
Another measure of insulin resistance is the modified insulin suppression test developed by Gerald Reaven at Stanford University. The test correlates well with the euglycemic clamp, with less operator-dependent error. This test has been used to advance the large body of research relating to the metabolic syndrome.

Patients initially receive 25 μg of octreotide (Sandostatin) in 5 mL of normal saline over 3 to 5 minutes via intravenous infusion (IV) as an initial bolus, and then, are infused continuously with an intravenous infusion of somatostatin (0.27 μg/m^{2}/min) to suppress endogenous insulin and glucose secretion. Next, insulin and 20% glucose are infused at rates of 32 and 267 mg/m^{2}/min, respectively. Blood glucose is checked at zero, 30, 60, 90, and 120 minutes, and thereafter, every 10 minutes for the last half-hour of the test. These last four values are averaged to determine the steady-state plasma glucose level (SSPG). Subjects with an SSPG greater than 150 mg/dL are considered to be insulin-resistant.

=== Static function tests ===
Given the complicated nature of the "clamp" technique (and the potential dangers of hypoglycemia in some patients), alternatives have been sought to simplify the measurement of insulin resistance. The first was the Homeostatic Model Assessment (HOMA), and more recent methods include the Quantitative insulin sensitivity check index (QUICKI) and SPINA-GR, a measure for insulin sensitivity. All of these calculated markers employ fasting insulin and glucose levels to calculate insulin resistance, and all correlate reasonably with the results of clamping studies.

==== Interpretation of results ====
  - HOMA-IR < 2: normal insulin sensitivity
  - HOMA-IR > 2: possible insulin resistance
  - HOMA-IR > 2,5: probable insulin resistance
  - HOMA-IR > 5: typical results for type 2 diabetes
  - SPINA-GR 1,41–9,00 mol/s: normal insulin sensitivity
  - SPINA-GR ≤ 1,40 mol/s: insulin resistance
  - SPINA-GR < 1,35 mol/s: typical results for type 2 diabetes

== Insulin resistance and aging ==
Insulin resistance normally increases with ageing in human adults, whereas insulin sensitivity is maintained in centenarians and familial human longevity. Greater longevity in shorter men is associated with reduced insulin resistance.

Chronic systemic inflammation increases with aging in human adults, and is associated with many aging-associated diseases. A vicious circle exists between aging and chronic inflammation.

== Prevention and management ==
Maintaining a healthy body weight and engaging in regular physical activity can help mitigate the risk of developing insulin resistance.

The primary treatment for insulin resistance is exercise and weight loss. Both metformin and thiazolidinediones improve insulin sensitivity. Metformin is approved for prediabetes and type 2 diabetes and has become one of the more commonly prescribed medications for insulin resistance.

The Diabetes Prevention Program (DPP) showed that exercise and diet were nearly twice as effective as metformin at reducing the risk of progressing to type 2 diabetes. However, the participants in the DPP trial regained about 40% of the weight that they had lost at the end of 2.8 years, resulting in a similar incidence of diabetes development in both the lifestyle intervention and the control arms of the trial. In epidemiological studies, higher levels of physical activity (more than 90 minutes per day) reduce the risk of diabetes by 28%.

Furthermore, physical training has also generally been seen to be an effective antagonist of insulin resistance in obese or overweight children and adolescents (under the age of 19).

=== Aerobic or resistance training ===
A 2016 review indicated that aerobic physical training for six or more weeks may reduce fasting insulin levels in overweight children.

=== Food constituents ===
Resistant starch from high-amylose corn, amylomaize, has been shown to reduce insulin resistance in healthy individuals, in individuals with insulin resistance, and in individuals with type 2 diabetes.

Some types of polyunsaturated fatty acids (omega-3) may moderate the progression of insulin resistance into type 2 diabetes, however, omega-3 fatty acids appear to have limited ability to reverse insulin resistance, and they cease to be efficacious once type 2 diabetes is established.

== History ==
The concept that insulin resistance may be the underlying cause of diabetes mellitus type 2 was first advanced by Professor Wilhelm Falta and published in Vienna in 1931, and confirmed as contributory by Sir Harold Percival Himsworth of the University College Hospital Medical Centre in London in 1936; however, type 2 diabetes does not occur unless there is concurrent failure of compensatory insulin secretion.

=== Adaptive explanations ===
Some scholars go as far as to claim that neither insulin resistance, nor obesity really are metabolic disorders per se, but simply adaptive responses to sustained caloric surplus, intended to protect bodily organs from lipotoxicity (unsafe levels of lipids in the bloodstream and tissues): "Obesity should therefore not be regarded as a pathology or disease, but rather as the normal, physiologic response to sustained caloric surplus... As a consequence of the high level of lipid accumulation in insulin target tissues including skeletal muscle and liver, it has been suggested that exclusion of glucose from lipid-laden cells is a compensatory defense against further accumulation of lipogenic substrate."

Other prevailing thoughts that insulin resistance can be an evolutionary adaptation include the thrifty gene hypothesis. This hypothesis raises the point that if there is a genetic component to insulin resistance and Type 2 diabetes, these phenotypes should be selected against. Yet, there has been an increase in mean insulin resistance in both the normoglycemic population as well as the diabetic population.

J.V. Neel posits that in ancient human ancestors, during periods of heightened famine, genes facilitating increased glucose storage would have conferred an advantage. However, in today's modern environment, this is no longer the case.

Evidence contradicts Neel's hypothesis in studies of the Pima Indians, which suggest that individuals with higher insulin sensitivity tended to have higher weights, whereas those with insulin resistance tended to weigh less on average within this demographic.

Modern hypotheses propose that insulin metabolism serves as a socio-ecological adaptation, with insulin serving as the mechanism for allocating energy to different body components and insulin sensitivity being an adaptation to regulate this energy allocation. The Behavioral Switch Hypothesis suggests that insulin resistance leads to two methods of altering reproductive and behavioral strategies. These strategies are termed "r to K" and "soldier to diplomat". The "r to K" strategy involves directing insulin through the placenta to the fetus, resulting in weight gain in the fetus but not the mother, indicating an increase in parental investment (K strategy). In the "soldier to diplomat" strategy, the insensitivity of skeletal muscle to insulin could redirect glucose to the brain, which does not require insulin receptors. This has been shown to enhance cognitive development across various studies.

== Research ==
Both acute and chronic stress are under preliminary research for the potential to participate in insulin resistance.

Experimental approaches for insulin resistance are under investigation, including stem cell-based therapies, extracellular vesicles such as exosomes, pharmacological combinations, and tissue-engineering platforms; however, these strategies remain primarily in the research stage and are not established standard treatments.

== See also ==
- Pancreatic beta cell function
- Chronic Somogyi rebound – Theoretical elevated blood sugar for diabetics in the morning
- Hyperinsulinemia
- Resistin – Mammalian protein, acts as a multifunctional hormone
- Chronic stress
- Systemic inflammation
- Circadian rhythm disruption
- Advanced glycation end-products
- Polyendocrine metabolic ovarian syndrome
