= Glucose clamp technique =

- MeSH: D015309

Glucose clamp technique is a method for quantifying insulin secretion and resistance. It is used to measure either how well an individual metabolizes glucose or how sensitive an individual is to insulin.

== Procedure ==
Two types of clamp are quite commonly used. The hyperglycemic clamp, which requires maintaining a high blood sugar level by perfusion or infusion with glucose, is a way to quantify how fast beta-cells respond to glucose. The hyperinsulinemic clamp, which requires maintaining a high insulin level by perfusion or infusion with insulin, is a way to quantify how sensitive the tissue is to insulin. The hyperinsulinemic clamp is also called euglycemic clamp, meaning a normal blood sugar level is maintained.

Hyperglycemic clamp technique: The plasma glucose concentration is acutely raised to 125 mg/dl above basal levels by a continuous infusion of glucose. This hyperglycemic plateau is maintained by adjustment of a variable glucose infusion, based on the rate of insulin secretion and glucose metabolism. Because the plasma glucose concentration is held constant, the glucose infusion rate is an index of insulin secretion and glucose metabolism. The hyperglycemic clamps are often used to assess insulin secretion capacity.

Hyperinsulinemic-euglycemic clamp technique: The plasma insulin concentration is acutely raised and maintained at 100 μU/ml by a continuous infusion of insulin. Meanwhile, the plasma glucose concentration is held constant at basal levels by a variable glucose infusion. When the steady-state is achieved, the glucose infusion rate equals glucose uptake by all the tissues in the body and is therefore a measure of tissue insulin sensitivity. The hyperinsulinemic clamps are often used to measure insulin resistance.

== History ==
The glucose clamp technique was developed by University of Texas (UT) School of Medicine Professors DeFronzo, Andres and Tobin in 1979. It has since been the gold standard for pharmacodynamic studies in diabetes drug development and diagnostics evaluation. In human clinical trials, manual glucose clamps as well as the more modern method of automated glucose clamp find common use.

== See also ==
- Insulin resistance
- Metabolic Score for Insulin Resistance (METS-IR)
- Homeostatic model assessment
- SPINA-GBeta
- SPINA-GR
- Disposition index
- Diabetes mellitus
- Diabetes management
