= Homeostatic model assessment =

Method to quantify insulin resistance

The homeostatic model assessment (HOMA) is a method used to quantify insulin resistance and beta-cell function. It was first described under the name HOMA by Matthews et al. in 1985.

== Derivation ==
The HOMA authors used data from physiological studies to develop mathematical equations describing glucose regulation as a feedback loop. They published computer software that solves the equations, so that insulin resistance and β-cell function can be estimated from fasting glucose and insulin levels. They also published an equation (see below) that gave approximately the same answers as an early version of the computer software.

The computer model has since been improved to a HOMA2 model to better reflect human physiology and recalibrated to modern insulin assays. In this updated version it is possible to determine insulin sensitivity and β-cell function from paired fasting plasma glucose and radioimmunoassay insulin, specific insulin, or C-peptide concentrations. The authors recommend the computer software be used wherever possible.

== Notes ==
The HOMA model was originally designed as a special case of a more general structural (HOMA-CIGMA) model that includes the continuous infusion of glucose with model assessment (CIGMA) approach; both techniques use mathematical equations to describe the functioning of the major effector organs influencing glucose/insulin interactions.

The approximating equation for insulin resistance, in the early model, used a fasting plasma sample, and was derived by use of the insulin-glucose product, divided by a constant: (assuming normal-weight, normal subjects < 35 years, having 100% β-cell function an insulin resistance of 1)

$\text{HOMA-IR} = \frac{\text{Glucose} \times \text{Insulin}}{22.5}$	$\text{HOMA-IR} = \frac{\text{Glucose} \times \text{Insulin}}{405}$
$\text{HOMA-}\beta = \frac{20 \times \text{Insulin}}{\text{Glucose}-3.5} \%$	$\text{HOMA-}\beta = \frac{360 \times \text{Insulin}}{\text{Glucose}-63} \%$
Glucose in Molar Units mmol/L	Glucose in mass units mg/dL

IR is insulin resistance and %β is the β-cell function (more precisely, an index for glucose tolerance, i.e. a measure for the ability to counteract the glucose load). Insulin is given in μU/mL. Glucose and insulin are both during fasting.

This model correlated well with estimates using the euglycemic clamp method (r = 0.88).

The authors have tested HOMA and HOMA2 extensively against other measures of insulin resistance (or its reciprocal, insulin sensitivity) and β-cell function.

The approximation formulae above relate to HOMA and are crude estimates of the model near normal levels of glucose and insulin in man. The actual calculated HOMA2 compartmental model is published and is available online.

== See also ==
- QUICKI
- SPINA-GBeta
- SPINA-GR
