= SimThyr =

Medical research simulation software

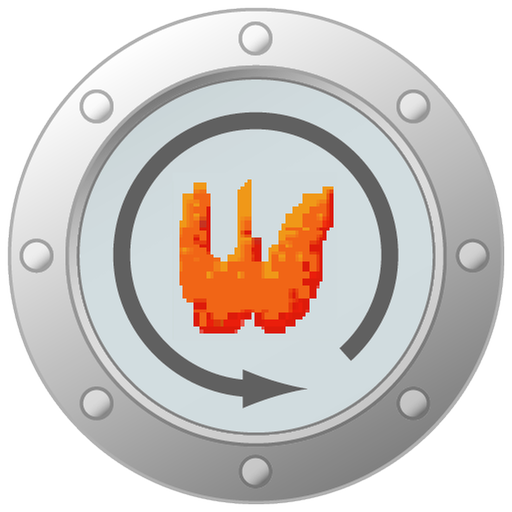

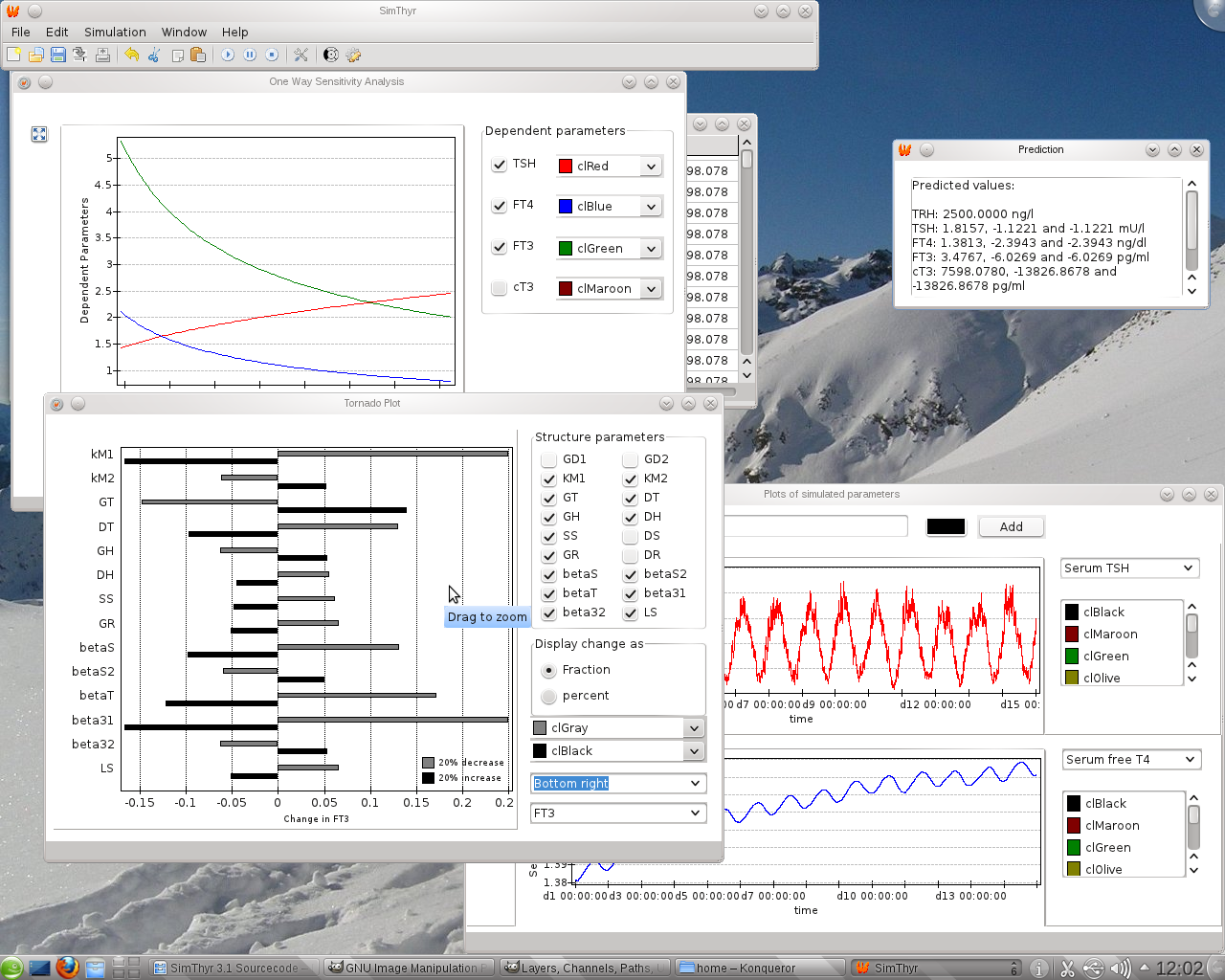
- SimThyr 3.1 on openSUSE 11
- Original authors: Johannes W. Dietrich, Ulla Mitzdorf, Renate Pickardt, Rudolf Hoermann, John E. M. Midgley
- Developer: Ruhr University Bochum
- Initial release: 2002 (23 years ago)
- Stable release: 4.0.6 / April 23, 2022; 3 years ago
- Repository: sourceforge.net/p/simthyr/code/HEAD/tree/
- Written in: Pascal and Object Pascal
- Operating system: macOS, Windows and Linux
- Platform: PowerPC, IA-32, x86-64 and ARM, m68k (legacy versions only)
- Available in: British English, German (SimThyr 2.0 or older only)
- Type: Free scientific application software for physiological simulations
- License: BSD-style
- Website: simthyr.sourceforge.net

SimThyr is a free continuous dynamic simulation program for the pituitary-thyroid feedback control system. The open-source program is based on a nonlinear model of thyroid homeostasis. In addition to simulations in the time domain the software supports various methods of sensitivity analysis. Its simulation engine is multi-threaded and supports multiple processor cores. SimThyr provides a GUI, which allows for visualising time series, modifying constant structure parameters of the feedback loop (e.g. for simulation of certain diseases), storing parameter sets as XML files (referred to as "scenarios" in the software) and exporting results of simulations in various formats that are suitable for statistical software. SimThyr is intended for both educational purposes and in-silico research.

== Mathematical model ==
The underlying model of thyroid homeostasis is based on fundamental biochemical, physiological and pharmacological principles, e.g. Michaelis-Menten kinetics, non-competitive inhibition and empirically justified kinetic parameters. The model has been validated in healthy controls and in cohorts of patients with hypothyroidism and thyrotoxicosis.

== Scientific uses ==
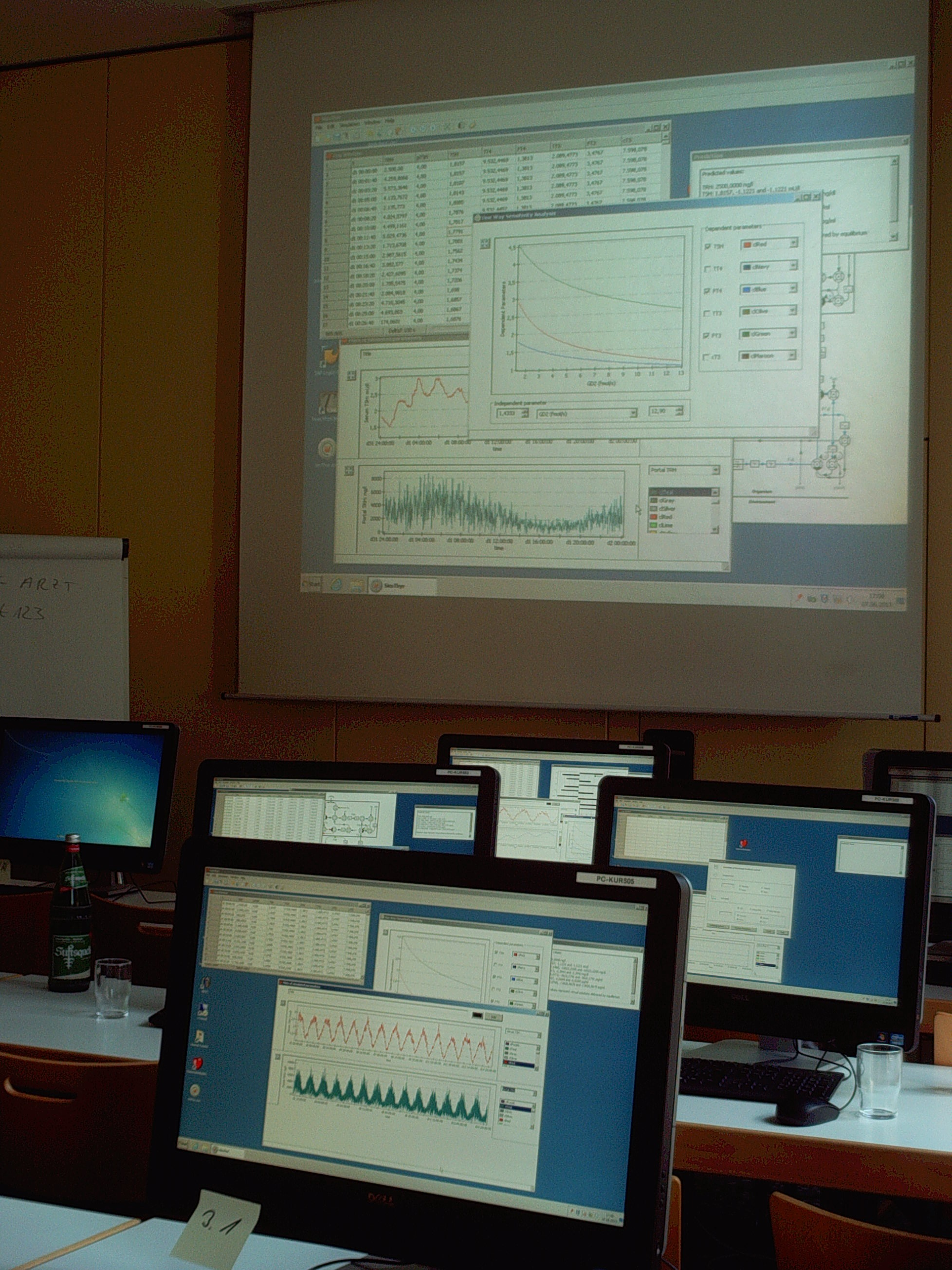
SimThyr used for educational purposes in a computer resource centre

Multiple studies have employed SimThyr for in silico research on the control of thyroid function.

The original version was developed to check hypotheses about the generation of pulsatile TSH release. Later and expanded versions of the software were used to develop the hypothesis of the TSH-T3 shunt in the hypothalamus-pituitary-thyroid axis, to assess the validity of calculated parameters of thyroid homeostasis (including SPINA-GT and SPINA-GD) and to study allostatic mechanisms leading to non-thyroidal illness syndrome.

SimThyr was also used to show that the release rate of thyrotropin is controlled by multiple factors other than T4 and that the relation between free T4 and TSH may be different in euthyroidism, hypothyroidism and thyrotoxicosis.

== Public perception, reception and discussion of the software ==
SimThyr is free and open-source software. This ensures the source code to be available, which facilitates scientific discussion and reviewing of the underlying model. Additionally, the fact that it is freely available may result in economical benefits.

The software provides an editor that enables users to modify most structure parameters of the information processing structure. This functionality fosters simulation of several functional diseases of the thyroid and the pituitary gland. Parameter sets may be stored as MIRIAM- and MIASE-compliant XML files.

On the other hand, the complexity of the user interface and the lack of the ability to model treatment effects have been criticized.

== See also ==
- Hypothalamic–pituitary–thyroid axis
- Thyroid function tests
