= Thyroid's secretory capacity =

- Reference ranges for SPINA-GT and other thyroid function tests
- Synonyms: SPINA-GT, GT, T4 output, thyroid hormone output, thyroid's incretory capacity, functional thyroid capacity
- Reference range: 1.41–8.67 pmol/s
- Test of: Maximum amount of T4 produced by the thyroid in one second
- MeSH: D013960
- LOINC: 82368-2

Thyroid's secretory capacity (G_{T}, also referred to as thyroid's incretory capacity, maximum thyroid hormone output, T4 output or, if calculated from serum levels of thyrotropin and thyroxine, as SPINA-GT (Note: SPINA is an acronym for "structure parameter inference approach".)) is the maximum stimulated amount of thyroxine that the thyroid can produce in a given time-unit (e.g. one second).

G_{T} is both a theoretical concept that is used in physiological theories of thyroid function and (as a calculated parameter) a biomarker for advanced diagnosis of thyroid disorders.

== How to determine G_{T} ==
Experimentally, G_{T} can be determined by stimulating the thyroid with a high thyrotropin concentration (e.g. by means of rhTSH, i.e. recombinant human thyrotropin) and measuring its output in terms of T4 production, or by measuring the serum concentration of protein-bound iodine-131 after administration of radioiodine. These approaches are, however, costly and accompanied by significant exposure to radiation.

In vivo, G_{T} can also be estimated from equilibrium levels of TSH and T4 or free T4. In this case it is calculated with

$\hat G_T = {{\beta _T (D_T + [TSH])(1 + K_{41} [TBG] + K_{42} [TBPA])[FT_4 ]} \over {\alpha _T [TSH]}}$

or

$\hat G_T = {{\beta _T (D_T + [TSH])[TT_4 ]} \over {\alpha _T [TSH]}}$

[TSH]: Serum thyrotropin concentration (in mIU/L or μIU/mL)
[FT4]: Serum free T4 concentration (in pmol/L)
[TT4]: Serum total T4 concentration (in nmol/L)
$\hat G_T$: Theoretical (apparent) secretory capacity (SPINA-GT)
$\alpha _T$: Dilution factor for T4 (reciprocal of apparent volume of distribution, 0.1 L^{−1})
$\beta _T$: Clearance exponent for T4 (1.1e-6 sec^{−1}), i. e., reaction rate constant for degradation
K_{41}: Binding constant T4-TBG (2e10 L/mol)
K_{42}: Binding constant T4-TBPA (2e8 L/mol)
D_{T}: EC_{50} for TSH (2.75 mU/L)

The method is based on mathematical models of thyroid homeostasis. Calculating the secretory capacity with one of these equations is an inverse problem. Therefore, certain conditions (e.g. stationarity) have to be fulfilled to deliver a reliable result.

=== Specific secretory capacity ===
The ratio of SPINA-GT and thyroid volume V_{T} (as determined e.g. by ultrasonography)

$\hat{G}_{TS}=\frac{\hat{G}_{T}}{{V}_{T}}$,

i.e.

$\hat{G}_{TS}=\frac{\beta_{T}(D_{T}+[TSH])(1+K_{41}[TBG]+K_{ 42 }[TBPA])[FT_{4}]}{{\alpha_{T}[TSH]{V}_{T}}}$

or

$\hat{G}_{TS}=\frac{{{\beta_{T}(D_{T}+[TSH])[TT_{4}]}}}{{\alpha_{T}[TSH]{V}_{T}}}$

is referred to as specific thyroid capacity (SPINA-GTs). It is a measure for how much one millilitre of thyroid tissue can produce under conditions of maximum stimulation. Thereby, SPINA-GTs is an estimate for the endocrine quality of thyroid tissue.

=== Reference Range ===
Percentiles for thyroid's secretory capacity (SPINA-GT) along with reference ranges for Jostel's TSH index (TSHI or JTI) and univariable reference ranges for thyrotropin (TSH) and free thyroxine (FT4), shown in the two-dimensional phase plane defined by serum concentrations of TSH and FT4.

| Lower limit | Upper limit | Unit |
| 1.41 | 8.67 | pmol/s |

The equations and their parameters are calibrated for adult humans with a body mass of 70 kg and a plasma volume of ca. 2.5 L.

== Clinical significance ==
=== Validity ===
SPINA-GT is elevated in primary hyperthyroidism and reduced in both primary hypothyroidism and untreated autoimmune thyroiditis. It has been observed to correlate (in positive direction) with thyroglobulin concentration, resting energy expenditure, resting heart rate, the colour Doppler ultrasound pattern and thyroid volume, and (with negative direction) to thyroid autoantibody titres, which reflect organ destruction due to autoimmunity. Elevated SPINA-GT in Graves' disease is reversible with antithyroid treatment. While SPINA-GT is significantly altered in primary thyroid disorders, it is insensitive to disorders of secondary nature (e.g. pure pituitary diseases).

=== Reliability ===
In silico experiments with Monte Carlo simulations demonstrated that both SPINA-GT and SPINA-GD can be estimated with sufficient reliability, even if laboratory assays have limited accuracy. This was confirmed by longitudinal in vivo studies that showed that GT has lower intraindividual variation (i.e. higher reliability) than TSH, FT4 or FT3.

=== Clinical utility ===
In clinical trials SPINA-GT was significantly elevated in patients with Graves' disease and toxic adenoma compared to normal subjects. It is also elevated in diffuse and nodular goiters, and reduced in untreated autoimmune thyroiditis. In patients with toxic adenoma it has higher specificity and positive likelihood ratio for diagnosis of thyrotoxicosis than serum concentrations of thyrotropin, free T4 or free T3. GT's specificity is also high in thyroid disorders of secondary or tertiary origin.

Calculating SPINA-GT has proved to be useful in challenging clinical situations, e.g. for differential diagnosis of subclinical hypothyroidism and elevated TSH concentration due to type 2 allostatic load (as it is typical for obesity and certain psychiatric diseases). For this purpose, its usage has been recommended in sociomedical assessment. It has also been suggested in guidelines as a supplementary biomarker for metabolic monitoring in MCT8 deficiency (Allan-Herndon-Dudley syndrome), a rare X-linked genetic disorder affecting thyroid hormone transport.

=== Pathophysiological and therapeutic implications ===
In patients suffering from toxic adenoma, toxic multinodular goitre and Graves' disease radioiodine therapy leads to a significant decrease of the initially elevated SPINA-GT.

With a basal mean value of 6.91 pmol/s, SPINA-GT is relatively high within its reference range in patients affected by resistance to thyroid hormone β (RTHβ), potentially due to thyroid hyperplasia mediated by chronic stimulation. Under treatment with triiodothyroacetic acid (TRIAC) it significantly declines, probably reflecting a mechanism of dynamical compensation reducing the thyroid's functional cell mass.

Before patients undergo thyroidectomy for thyroid nodules, SPINA-GT is significantly reduced in cases of cancer compared to cases of benign nodules.

Correlation of SPINA-GT with creatinine clearance suggests a negative influence of uremic toxins on thyroid biology. In the initial phase of major non-thyroidal illness syndrome (NTIS) SPINA-GT may be temporarily elevated. In chronic NTIS as well as in certain non-critical chronic diseases, e.g. chronic fatigue syndrome or asthma SPINA-GT is slightly reduced.

According to the results of a community-based study in China it was associated to sleep duration and exercise habits. With respect to iodine supply, it showed a complex U-shaped pattern, being reduced in subjects consuming iodine-rich food, but elevated in situations of iodine excess. In two other studies from China, SPINA-GT correlated with negative direction to markers of obesity including body mass index, waist circumference and waist to hip ratio. This doesn't seem to be the case, however, in Western populations.

In women, therapy with Metformin results in increased SPINA-GT, in parallel to improved insulin sensitivity. This observation was reproducible in men with hypogonadism, but not in men with normal testosterone concentrations,. In postmenopausal women this effect was only observed in subjects on oestradiol replacement therapy. Therefore, the described phenomenon seems to depend on an interaction of metformin with sex hormones. In hyperthyroid men both SPINA-GT and SPINA-GD negatively correlate to erectile function, intercourse satisfaction, orgasmic function and sexual desire. Likewise, in women with thyrotoxicosis elevated thyroid's secretory capacity predicts depression and sexual dysfunction. Conversely, in androgen-deficient men with concomitant autoimmune thyroiditis, substitution therapy with testosterone leads to a decrease in thyroid autoantibody titres and an increase in SPINA-GT. In a large study from mainland China, SPINA-GT was elevated in certain psychiatric diseases including bipolar disorder and schizophrenia. In bipolar disorder with manic or mixed episodes it was higher than in cases with depressive episodes.

SPINA-GT is reduced in persons suffering from hidradenitis suppurativa compared to healthy controls with the same sex and age distribution. This phenomenon has been ascribed to B-cell-mediated hypothyroidism, i.e. hypothyroid Graves' disease due to inhibiting TSH receptor autoantibodies (iTRAb).

In patients with autoimmune thyroiditis, a gluten-free diet results in increased SPINA-GT (in parallel to sinking autoantibody titres). Statin therapy has the same effect, but only if supply with vitamin D is sufficient. Accordingly, substitution therapy with 25-hydroxyvitamin D leads to rising secretory capacity, provided that the supply with vitamin E is adequate. This effect is potentiated by substitution therapy with myo-inositol and selenomethionine or, in women, with dehydroepiandrosterone, but impaired in males with early-onset androgenic alopecia. The effects of vitamin D and selenomethionine are attenuated in hyperprolactinaemia, suggesting an inhibitory effect of prolactin. Although both vitamin D supplementation and gluten-free diet result in increased SPINA-GT, there seems to be a complex interaction between both therapeutic measures, since vitamin D treatment is only able to elevate the thyroid's secretory capacity in subjects not following any dietary recommendation.

On the other hand, men treated with spironolactone are faced with decreasing SPINA-GT (in addition to rising thyroid antibody titres). It has, therefore, been concluded that spironolactone may aggravate thyroid autoimmunity in men.

In subjects with type 2 diabetes, treatment with beta blockers resulted in decreased SPINA-GT, suggesting sympathetic innervation to contribute to the control of thyroid function. In diabetic women, but not in men, SPINA-GT shows a positive correlation to the β-C-terminal cross-linked telopeptides of type I collagen (β-CTX), a marker of bone resorption. In both diabetic and non-diabetic persons it correlates (negatively) with age and (positively) with the concentrations of troponin T and HbA1c.

SPINA-GT correlates to mechanical pain sensitivity (MPS) in quantitative sensory testing (QST) and to measures of respiratory arrhythmia in the analysis of heart rate variability, indicating a potential link to both sensorimotor and autonomic neuropathy.

A study in euthyroid subjects with structural heart disease found that increased SPINA-GT predicts the risk of malignant arrhythmia including ventricular fibrillation and ventricular tachycardia. This applies to both incidence and event-free survival. Likewise, SPINA-GT is elevated in a significant subgroup of patients with takotsubo syndrome, especially in non-survivors. A stress-mediated effect on SPINA-GT is also suggested by the observation that it is increased in persons with a history of psychological trauma. On the other hand, two studies found negative correlation between SPINA-GT and markers of dispersion in cardiac repolarisation, including Tp-e interval, JT interval, Tp-e/ QT ratio and Tp-e/QTc ratio. These results suggest that reduced thyroid function may trigger cardiovascular mortality as well.

Among subjects with Parkinson's disease, SPINA-GT is significantly elevated in tremor-dominant and mixed subtypes compared to the akinetic-rigid type. In comparison, SPINA-GT is associated with progression-related motor heterogeneity in spinocerebellar ataxia type 3. Elevated thyroid's secretory capacity is detectable in pre-ataxic ATXN3 carriers and is associated with subsequent worsening of results on the Scale for the Assessment and Rating of Ataxia (SARA) in a longitudinal evaluation.

Specific secretory capacity (SPINA-GTs) is reduced in obesity and autoimmune thyroiditis.

Endocrine disruptors may affect stimulated thyroid output, as demonstrated by a positive correlation of SPINA-GT with exposure to 2-hydroxynaphthalene (2-NAP), urinary mercury concentration and the excretion of certain phthalate metabolites, and negative correlation with combined exposure to polycyclic aromatic hydrocarbons (PAHs) and nickel. Additionally, SPINA-GT is altered in persons exposed to butylparaben and propylparaben.

In pregnant women with latent autoimmune thyroiditis (i. e., in the euthyroid state), both SPINA-GT and SPINA-GD rise under the condition that the supply of selenium and vitamin D is sufficient. It is unclear whether these observations reflect a physiological response (in the sense of a type 2 allostatic reaction) or declining autoimmunity.

=== Prognostic value ===
In a longitudinal evaluation of a large sample of the general US population over 10 years, reduced SPINA-GT significantly predicted all-cause mortality.

A prospective cohort study that included patients who eventually underwent hemithyroidectomy revealed that preoperative SPINA-GT was a better predictor of postoperative hypothyroidism than TSH concentration, Jostel's TSH index, remnant thyroid volume, remnant thyroid volume to BSA ratio and thyroid autoantibodies.

== See also ==
- Thyroid function tests
- Sum activity of peripheral deiodinases
- Jostel's TSH index
- Thyrotroph Thyroid Hormone Sensitivity Index
- Thyroid Feedback Quantile-based Index
- SimThyr
- SPINA-GBeta
- SPINA-GR
