= Hypothalamic–pituitary–thyroid axis =

Part of the neuroendocrine system

Short overview of thyroid homeostasis.

The hypothalamic–pituitary–thyroid axis (HPT axis for short, a.k.a. thyroid homeostasis or thyrotropic feedback control) is part of the neuroendocrine system responsible for the regulation of metabolism and also responds to stress.

As its name suggests, it depends upon the hypothalamus, the pituitary gland, and the thyroid gland.

The hypothalamus senses low circulating levels of thyroid hormone (Triiodothyronine (T3) and Thyroxine (T4)) and responds by releasing thyrotropin-releasing hormone (TRH). The TRH stimulates the anterior pituitary to produce thyroid-stimulating hormone (TSH). The TSH, in turn, stimulates the thyroid to produce thyroid hormone until levels in the blood return to normal. Thyroid hormone exerts negative feedback control over the hypothalamus as well as anterior pituitary, thus controlling the release of both TRH from hypothalamus and TSH from anterior pituitary gland.

The HPA, HPG, and HPT axes are three pathways in which the hypothalamus and pituitary direct neuroendocrine function.

== Physiology ==
Thyrotropic feedback control on a more detailed and quantitative level.

Thyroid homeostasis results from a multi-loop feedback system that is found in virtually all higher vertebrates. Proper function of thyrotropic feedback control is indispensable for growth, differentiation, reproduction and intelligence. Very few animals (e.g. axolotls and sloths) have impaired thyroid homeostasis that exhibits a very low set-point that is assumed to underlie the metabolic and ontogenetic anomalies of these animals.

The pituitary gland secretes thyrotropin (TSH; Thyroid Stimulating Hormone) that stimulates the thyroid to secrete thyroxine (T4) and, to a lesser degree, triiodothyronine (T3). The major portion of T3, however, is produced in peripheral organs, e.g. liver, adipose tissue, glia and skeletal muscle by deiodination from circulating T4. Deiodination is controlled by numerous hormones and nerval signals including TSH, vasopressin and catecholamines.

Both peripheral thyroid hormones (iodothyronines) inhibit thyrotropin secretion from the pituitary (negative feedback). Consequently, equilibrium concentrations for all hormones are attained.

TSH secretion is also controlled by thyrotropin releasing hormone (thyroliberin, TRH), whose secretion itself is again suppressed by plasma T4 and T3 in CSF (long feedback, Fekete–Lechan loop). Additional feedback loops are ultrashort feedback control of TSH secretion (Brokken-Wiersinga-Prummel loop) and linear feedback loops controlling plasma protein binding.

Recent research suggested the existence of an additional feedforward motif linking TSH release to deiodinase activity in humans. The existence of this TSH-T3 shunt could explain why deiodinase activity is higher in hypothyroid patients and why a minor fraction of affected individuals may benefit from substitution therapy with T3.

Convergence of multiple afferent signals in the control of TSH release including but not limited to T3, cytokines and TSH receptor antibodies may be the reason for the observation that the relation between free T4 concentration and TSH levels deviates from a pure loglinear relation that has previously been proposed. Recent research suggests that ghrelin also plays a role in the stimulation of T4 production and the subsequent suppression of TSH directly and by negative feedback.

== Functional states of thyrotropic feedback control ==
- Euthyroidism: Normal thyroid function
- Hypothyroidism: Reduced thyroid function
  - primary hypothyroidism: Feedback loop interrupted by low thyroid secretory capacity, e.g. after thyroid surgery or in case of autoimmune thyroiditis
  - secondary hypothyroidism: Feedback loop interrupted on the level of pituitary, e.g. in anterior pituitary failure
  - tertiary hypothyroidism: Lacking stimulation by TRH, e.g. in hypothalamic failure, Pickardt–Fahlbusch syndrome or euthyroid sick syndrome.
- Hyperthyroidism: Inappropriately increased thyroid function
  - primary hyperthyroidism: Inappropriate secretion of thyroid hormones, e.g. in case of Graves' disease.
  - secondary hyperthyroidism: Rare condition, e.g. in case of TSH producing pituitary adenoma or partial thyroid hormone resistance.
- Thyrotoxicosis: Over-supply with thyroid hormones, e.g. by overdosed exogenously levothyroxine supplementation.
- Low-T3 syndrome and high-T3 syndrome: Consequences of step-up hypodeiodination, e.g. in critical illness as an example for type 1 allostasis, or hyperdeiodination, as in type 2 allostasis, including posttraumatic stress disorder.
- Resistance to thyroid hormone: Feedback loop interrupted on the level of pituitary thyroid hormone receptors.

== Diagnostics ==
Standard procedures cover the determination of serum levels of the following hormones:

- TSH (thyrotropin, thyroid stimulating hormone)
- Free T4
- Free T3

For special conditions the following assays and procedures may be required:

- Total T4
- Total T3
- TBG
- TRH test
- Thyroid's secretory capacity (GT)
- Sum activity of peripheral deiodinases (GD)
- TSH Index (TSHI)

== See also ==
- Thyroid function tests
- Hypothalamic–pituitary–adrenal axis
- Hypothalamic–pituitary–gonadal axis
- Hypothalamic–neurohypophyseal system
- SimThyr, a free computer simulation for thyroid homeostasis in humans
