= Pulsatile secretion =

Pattern of chemical secretion in cells and tissues

Pulsatile secretion is a biochemical phenomenon observed in a wide variety of cell and tissue types, in which chemical products are secreted in a regular temporal pattern. The most common cellular products observed to be released in this manner are intercellular signaling molecules such as hormones or neurotransmitters. Examples of hormones that are secreted pulsatilely include insulin, thyrotropin, TRH, gonadotropin-releasing hormone (GnRH) and growth hormone (GH). In the nervous system, pulsatility is observed in oscillatory activity from central pattern generators. In the heart, pacemakers are able to work and secrete in a pulsatile manner. A pulsatile secretion pattern is critical to the function of many hormones in order to maintain the delicate homeostatic balance necessary for essential life processes, such as development and reproduction. Variations of the concentration in a certain frequency can be critical to hormone function, as evidenced by the case of GnRH agonists, which cause functional inhibition of the receptor for GnRH due to profound downregulation in response to constant (tonic) stimulation. Pulsatility may function to sensitize target tissues to the hormone of interest and upregulate receptors, leading to improved responses. This heightened response may have served to improve the animal's fitness in its environment and promote its evolutionary retention.

Pulsatile secretion in its various forms is observed in:

- Hypothalamic–pituitary–gonadal axis (HPG) related hormones
- Glucocorticoids
- Insulin
- Growth hormone
- Parathyroid hormone

== Neuroendocrine pulsatility ==
Nervous system control over hormone release is based in the hypothalamus, from which the neurons that populate the pariventricular and arcuate nuclei originate. These neurons project to the median eminence, where they secrete releasing hormones into the hypophysial portal system connecting the hypothalamus with the pituitary gland. There, they dictate endocrine function via the four HPG axes. Recent studies have begun to offer evidence that many pituitary hormones which have been observed to be released episodically are preceded by pulsatile secretion of their associated releasing hormone from the hypothalamus in a similar pulsatile fashion. Novel research into the cellular mechanisms associated with pituitary hormone pulsatility, such as that observed for luteinizing hormone (LH) and follicle-stimulating hormone (FSH), has indicated similar pulses into the hypophyseal vessels of gonadotropin-releasing hormone (GnRH).

== Luteinizing hormone and follicle-stimulating hormone (HPG axis) ==
LH is released from the pituitary gland along with FSH in response to GnRH release into the hypophyseal portal system. Pulsatile GnRH release causes pulsatile LH and FSH release to occur, which modulates and maintains appropriate levels of bioavailable gonadal hormone—testosterone in males and estradiol in females—subject to the requirements of a superior feedback loop. In females the levels of LH is typically 1–20 IU/L during the reproductive period and is estimated to be 1.8–8.6 IU/L in males over 18 years of age.

== Adrenocorticotropin and glucocorticoids (HPA axis) ==
Regular pulses of glucocorticoids, mainly cortisol in the case of humans, are released regularly from the adrenal cortex following a circadian pattern in addition to their release as a part of the stress response. Cortisol release follows a high frequency of pulses forming an ultradian rhythm, with amplitude being the primary variation in its release, so that the signal is amplitude modulated. Glucocorticoid pulsatlity has been observed to follow a circadian rhythm, with highest levels observed before waking and before anticipated mealtimes. This pattern in amplitude of release is observed to be consistent across vertebrates. Studies done in humans, rats, and sheep have also observed a similar circadian pattern of release of adrenocorticotropin (ACTH) shortly preceding the pulse in the resulting corticosteroid. It is currently hypothesized that the observed pulsatility of ACTH and glucocorticoids is driven via pulsatility of corticotropin-releasing hormone (CRH), however there exist few data to support this due to difficulty in measuring CRH.

== Thyrotropin and thyroid hormones (HPT axis) ==
Circadian and ultradian rhythms of thyrotropin (TSH) concentration. Simulated time series created with SimThyr.

The secretion pattern of thyrotropin (TSH) is shaped by infradian, circadian and ultradian rhythms. Infradian rhythmis are mainly represented by circannual variation mirroring the seasonality of thyroid function. Circadian rhythms lead to peak (acrophase) secretion around midnight and nadir concentrations around noon and in the early afternoon. A similar pattern is observed for triiodothyronine, however with a phase shift. Pulsatile release contributes to the ultradian rhythm of TSH concentration with about 10 pulses per 24 hours. The amplitude of the circadian and ultradian rhythms is reduced in severe non-thyroidal illness syndrome (TACITUS).

Contemporary theories assume that autocrine and paracrine (ultrashort) feedback mechanisms controlling TSH secretion within the anterior pituitary gland are a major factor contributing to the evolution of its pulsatility.

== Insulin ==
Insulin release from the islet of Langerhans is pulsatile with a period of 3–6 minutes.

Pulsatile insulin secretion from individual beta cells is driven by oscillation of the calcium concentration in the cells. In beta cells lacking contact (i.e. outside islets of Lagerhans), the periodicity of these oscillations is rather variable (2–10 min). However, within an islet of Langerhans, the oscillations become synchronized by electrical coupling between closely located beta cells that are connected by gap junctions, and the periodicity is more uniform (3–6 min). In addition to gap junctions, pulse coordination is managed by ATP signaling. Alpha and beta cells in the pancreas also share secrete factors in a similar pulsatile manner.
