= Heterostasis (cybernetics) =

Heterostasis is a medical term. It is a neologism coined by Walter Cannon intended to connote an alternative but related meaning to its lexical sibling Homeostasis, which means 'same state'. Any device, organ, system or organism capable of Heterostasis (multistable behavior) can be represented by an abstract state machine composed of a characteristic set of related, interconnected states, linked dynamically by change processes allowing transition between states.

Although the term 'Heterostasis' is an obvious rearrangement (by syntactically substituting the prefix 'Hetero-' for its dichotome 'Homeo-', and likewise swapping the semantic reference, from 'same'/'single' to 'different'/'many'), the endocrinologist Hans Selye is generally credited with its invention. An excellent overview of the two concepts is contained in the Cambridge Handbook of Psychophysiology, Chapter 19. Selye's ideas were used by Gunther et al., in which dimensionless numbers (allometric invariance analysis) were used to investigate the existence of heterostasis in canine cardiovascular systems.

== Alternative terminology ==
The equivalent term Allostasis is used in biological contexts, where state change is analog (continuous), but Heterostasis is sometimes preferred for systems which possess a finite number of distinct (discrete) internal states, such as those containing computational processes. The term Servomechanism is usually used in industrial/mechanical situations (non-biological and non-computational) where it often applies to analog state change, e.g. in a Direct Current Servomotor.
