= Thyroid function tests =

Collective term for blood tests used to check the function of the thyroid

- MeSH: D013960
- MedlinePlus: 003444

Thyroid function tests (TFTs) is a collective term for blood tests used to check the function of the thyroid. TFTs may be requested if a patient is thought to have hyperthyroidism (overactive thyroid) or hypothyroidism (underactive thyroid), or to monitor the effectiveness of either thyroid-suppression or hormone replacement therapy. It is also requested routinely in conditions linked to thyroid disease, such as atrial fibrillation and anxiety disorder.

A TFT panel typically includes thyroid hormones such as thyroid-stimulating hormone (TSH, thyrotropin) and thyroxine (T4), and triiodothyronine (T3) depending on local laboratory policy.

== Thyroid-stimulating hormone ==
Thyroid-stimulating hormone (TSH, thyrotropin) is generally increased in hypothyroidism and decreased in hyperthyroidism, making it the most important test for early detection of both of these conditions. The result of this assay is suggestive of the presence and cause of thyroid disease, since a measurement of elevated TSH generally indicates hypothyroidism, while a measurement of low TSH generally indicates hyperthyroidism. However, when TSH is measured by itself, it can yield misleading results, so additional thyroid function tests must be compared with the result of this test for accurate diagnosis.

TSH is produced in the pituitary gland. The production of TSH is controlled by thyrotropin-releasing hormone (TRH), which is produced in the hypothalamus. TSH levels may be suppressed by excess free T3 (fT3) or free T4 (fT4) in the blood.

=== History ===
First-generation TSH assays were done by radioimmunoassay and were introduced in 1965. There were variations and improvements upon TSH radioimmunoassay, but their use declined as a new immunometric assay technique became available in the middle of the 1980s. The new techniques were more accurate, leading to the second, third, and even fourth generations of TSH assay, with each generation possessing ten times greater functional sensitivity than the last. Third generation immunometric assay methods are typically automated. Fourth generation TSH immunometric assay has been developed for use in research.

=== Modern standard ===
Third generation TSH assay is the requirement for modern standards of care. TSH testing in the United States is typically carried out with automated platforms using advanced forms of immunometric assay. Nonetheless, there is no international standard for measurement of thyroid-stimulating hormone.

=== Interpretation ===
Accurate interpretation takes a variety of factors into account, such as the thyroid hormones i.e. thyroxine (T_{4}) and triiodothyronine (T_{3}), current medical status (such as pregnancy), certain medications like propylthiouracil, temporal effects including circadian rhythm and hysteresis, and other past medical history.

== Thyroid hormones ==
=== Total thyroxine ===
Total thyroxine is rarely measured, having been largely superseded by free thyroxine tests. Total thyroxine (Total T_{4}) is generally elevated in hyperthyroidism and decreased in hypothyroidism. It is usually slightly elevated in pregnancy secondary to increased levels of thyroid binding globulin (TBG).

Total T4 is measured to see the bound and unbound levels of T4. The total T4 is less useful in cases where there could be protein abnormalities. The total T4 is less accurate due to the large amount of T4 that is bound. The total T3 is measured in clinical practice since the T3 has decreased amount that is bound as compared to T4.

Reference ranges depend on the method of analysis. Results should always be interpreted using the range from the laboratory that performed the test. Example values are:

Lower limit	Upper limit	Unit
4, 5.5	11, 12.3	μg/dL
60	140, 160	nmol/L

=== Free thyroxine ===
Free thyroxine (fT_{4} or free T4) is generally elevated in hyperthyroidism and decreased in hypothyroidism.

Reference ranges depend on the method of analysis. Results should always be interpreted using the range from the laboratory that performed the test. Example values are:

Patient type	Lower limit	Upper limit	Unit
Normal adult	0.7, 0.8	1.4, 1.5, 1.8	ng/dL
Normal adult	9, 10, 12	18, 23	pmol/L
Infant 0–3 d	2.0	5.0	ng/dL
Infant 0–3 d	26	65	pmol/L
Infant 3–30 d	0.9	2.2	ng/dL
Infant 3–30 d	12	30	pmol/L
Child/Adolescent; 31 d – 18 y	0.8	2.0	ng/dL
Child/Adolescent; 31 d – 18 y	10	26	pmol/L
Pregnant	0.5	1.0	ng/dL
Pregnant	6.5	13	pmol/L

=== Total triiodothyronine ===
Total triiodothyronine (Total T_{3}) is rarely measured, having been largely superseded by free T3 tests. Total T3 is generally elevated in hyperthyroidism and decreased in hypothyroidism.

Reference ranges depend on the method of analysis. Results should always be interpreted using the range from the laboratory that performed the test. Example values are:

Test	Lower limit	Upper limit	Unit
Total triiodothyronine	60, 75	175, 181	ng/dL
Total triiodothyronine	0.9, 1.1	2.5, 2.7	nmol/L

=== Free triiodothyronine ===
Free triiodothyronine (fT_{3} or free T3) is generally elevated in hyperthyroidism and decreased in hypothyroidism.

Reference ranges depend on the method of analysis. Results should always be interpreted using the range from the laboratory that performed the test. Example values are:

Patient type	Lower limit	Upper limit	Unit
Normal adult	3.0	7.0	pg/mL
Normal adult	3.1	7.7	pmol/L
Children 2–16 y	3.0	7.0	pg/mL
Children 2–16 y	1.5	15.2	pmol/L

== Carrier proteins ==
=== Thyroxine-binding globulin ===
An increased thyroxine-binding globulin results in an increased total thyroxine and total triiodothyronine without an actual increase in hormonal activity of thyroid hormones.

Reference ranges:

Lower limit	Upper limit	Unit
12	30	mg/L

== Thyroglobulin ==
Reference ranges:

Lower limit	Upper limit	Unit
1.5	30	pmol/L
1	20	μg/L

=== Other binding hormones ===
- Transthyretin (prealbumin)
- Albumin

== Protein binding function ==
=== Thyroid hormone uptake ===
Thyroid hormone uptake (T_{uptake} or T_{3 uptake}) is a measure of the unbound thyroxine binding globulins in the blood, that is, the TBG that is unsaturated with thyroid hormone. Unsaturated TBG increases with decreased levels of thyroid hormones. It is not directly related to triiodothyronine, despite the name T_{3 uptake}.

Reference ranges:

Patient type	Lower limit	Upper limit	Unit
Females	25	35	%
In pregnancy	15	25	%
Males	25	35	%

=== Other protein binding tests ===
- Thyroid Hormone Binding Ratio (THBR)
- Thyroxine-binding index (TBI)

== Mixed parameters ==
=== Free thyroxine index ===
The Free Thyroxine Index (FTI or T7) is obtained by multiplying the total T_{4} with T_{3} uptake. FTI is considered to be a more reliable indicator of thyroid status in the presence of abnormalities in plasma protein binding. This test is rarely used now that reliable free thyroxine and free triiodothyronine assays are routinely available.

FTI is elevated in hyperthyroidism and decreased in hypothyroidism.

Patient type	Lower limit	Upper limit	Unit
Females	1.8	5.0	
Males	1.3	4.2	

== Calculated and structure parameters ==
Reference ranges for thyroid's secretory capacity (SPINA-GT) and Jostel's TSH index (TSHI or JTI) compared to univariable reference ranges for thyrotropin (TSH) and free thyroxine (FT4), shown in the two-dimensional phase plane defined by serum concentrations of TSH and FT4.

Derived structure parameters that describe constant properties of the overall feedback control system may add useful information for special purposes, e.g. in diagnosis of nonthyroidal illness syndrome or central hypothyroidism.

=== Secretory capacity (G_{T}) ===
Thyroid's secretory capacity (G_{T}, also referred to as SPINA-GT) is the maximum stimulated amount of thyroxine the thyroid can produce in one second. G_{T} is elevated in hyperthyroidism and reduced in hypothyroidism.

G_{T} is calculated with

$\hat G_T = {{\beta _T (D_T + [TSH])(1 + K_{41} [TBG] + K_{42} [TBPA])[FT_4 ]} \over {\alpha _T [TSH]}}$

or

$\hat G_T = {{\beta _T (D_T + [TSH])[TT_4 ]} \over {\alpha _T [TSH]}}$

$\alpha _T$: Dilution factor for T4 (reciprocal of apparent volume of distribution, 0.1 l^{−1})
$\beta _T$: Clearance exponent for T4 (1.1e-6 sec^{−1})
K_{41}: Dissociation constant T4-TBG (2e10 L/mol)
K_{42}: Dissociation constant T4-TBPA (2e8 L/mol)
D_{T}: EC_{50} for TSH (2.75 mU/L)

Lower limit	Upper limit	Unit
1.41	8.67	pmol/s

=== Sum activity of peripheral deiodinases (G_{D}) ===
The sum activity of peripheral deiodinases (G_{D}, also referred to as SPINA-GD) is reduced in nonthyroidal illness with hypodeiodination.

G_{D} is obtained with

$\hat G_D = {{\beta _{31} (K_{M1} + [FT_4 ])(1 + K_{30} [TBG])[FT_3 ]} \over {\alpha _{31} [FT_4 ]}}$

or

$\hat G_D = {{\beta _{31} (K_{M1} + [FT_4 ])[TT_3 ]} \over {\alpha _{31} [FT_4 ]}}$

$\alpha _{31}$: Dilution factor for T3 (reciprocal of apparent volume of distribution, 0.026 L^{−1})
$\beta _{31}$: Clearance exponent for T3 (8e-6 sec^{−1})
K_{M1}: Dissociation constant of type-1-deiodinase (5e-7 mol/L)
K_{30}: Dissociation constant T3-TBG (2e9 L/mol)

Lower limit	Upper limit	Unit
20	40	nmol/s

=== TSH index ===
Jostel's TSH index (JTI or TSHI) helps to determine thyrotropic function of anterior pituitary on a quantitative level. It is reduced in thyrotropic insufficiency and in certain cases of non-thyroidal illness syndrome.

It is calculated with

$TSHI = LN(TSH) + 0.1345 * FT4$.

Additionally, a standardized form of TSH index may be calculated with

$sTSHI = (TSHI - 2.7)/0.676$.

Parameter	Lower limit	Upper limit	Unit
TSHI	1.3	4.1	
sTSHI	-2	2	

=== TTSI ===
The Thyrotroph Thyroid Hormone Sensitivity Index (TTSI, also referred to as Thyrotroph T4 Resistance Index or TT4RI) was developed to enable fast screening for resistance to thyroid hormone. Somewhat similar to the TSH Index it is calculated from equilibrium values for TSH and FT4, however with a different equation.

Lower limit	Upper limit	Unit
100	150	

=== TFQI ===
The Thyroid Feedback Quantile-based Index (TFQI) is another parameter for thyrotropic pituitary function. It was defined to be more robust to distorted data than JTI and TTSI. It is calculated with

$TFQI = F_{FT4}(FT4) - (1 - F_{TSH}(TSH))$

from quantiles of FT4 and TSH concentration (as determined based on cumulative distribution functions). Per definition the TFQI has a mean of 0 and a standard deviation of 0.37 in a reference population. Higher values of TFQI are associated with obesity, metabolic syndrome, impaired renal function, diabetes, and diabetes-related mortality. TFQI results are also elevated in takotsubo syndrome, potentially reflecting type 2 allostatic load in the situation of psychosocial stress. Reductions have been observed in subjects with schizophrenia after initiation of therapy with oxcarbazepine, potentially reflecting declining allostatic load.

Lower limit	Upper limit	Unit
–0,74	+0.74	

=== Reconstructed set point ===
In healthy persons, the intra-individual variation of TSH and thyroid hormones is considerably smaller than the inter-individual variation. This results from a personal set point of thyroid homeostasis. In hypothyroidism, it is impossible to directly access the set point, but it can be reconstructed with methods of systems theory.

A computerised algorithm, called Thyroid-SPOT, which is based on this mathematical theory, has been implemented in software applications. In patients undergoing thyroidectomy it could be demonstrated that this algorithm can be used to reconstruct the personal set point with sufficient precision.

== Effects of drugs ==
Drugs can profoundly affect thyroid function tests. Listed below is a selection of important effects.

Effects of various drugs on tests of thyroid function
Cause	Drug	Effect on hormone concentrations	Effect on structure parameters
Inhibited TSH secretion	Dopamine, L-DOPA, glucocorticoids, somatostatin	↓T_{4}; ↓T_{3}; ↓TSH	↔SPINA-GT; ↓JTI
Inhibited synthesis or release of thyroid hormone	Iodine, lithium	↓T_{4}; ↓T_{3}; ↑TSH	↓SPINA-GT; ↔JTI
Inhibited conversion of T_{4} to T_{3} (Step-up hypodeiodination)	Amiodarone, glucocorticoids, propranolol, propylthiouracil, radiographic contrast agents	↓T_{3}; ↑rT_{3}; ↓, ↔, ↑T_{4} and fT_{4}; ↔, ↑TSH	↓SPINA-GD
Inhibited binding of T_{4}/T_{3} to serum proteins	Salicylates, phenytoin, carbamazepine, furosemide, nonsteroidal anti-inflammatory agents, heparin (in vitro effect)	↓T_{4}; ↓T_{3}; ↓fT_{4}E, ↔, ↑fT_{4}; ↔TSH	↓T4/fT4 ratio
Stimulated metabolism of iodothyronines	Phenobarbital, phenytoin, carbamazepine, rifampicin	↓T_{4}; ↓fT_{4}; ↔TSH	
Inhibited absorption of ingested T_{4}	Aluminium hydroxide, ferrous sulfate, cholestyramine, colestipol, iron sucralfate, soybean preparations, kayexalate	↓T_{4}; ↓fT_{4}; ↑TSH	
Increase in concentration of T_{4}-binding proteins	Estrogen, clofibrate, opiates (heroin, methadone), 5-fluorouracil, perphenazine	↑T_{4}; ↑T_{3}; ↔fT_{4}; ↔TSH	↔SPINA-GT; ↔SPINA-GD; ↔JTI; ↑T4/fT4 ratio
Decrease in concentration of T4-binding proteins	Androgens, glucocorticoids	↓T_{4}; ↓T_{3}; ↔fT_{4}; ↔TSH	↔SPINA-GT; ↔SPINA-GD; ↔JTI; ↓T4/fT4 ratio

↓: reduced serum concentration or structure parameter; ↑: increased serum concentration or structure parameter; ↔: no change; TSH: Thyroid-stimulating hormone; T_{3}: Total triiodothyronine; T_{4}: Total thyroxine; fT_{4}: Free thyroxine; fT_{3}: Free triiodothyronine; rT_{3}: Reverse triiodothyronine

== See also ==
- Reference ranges for thyroid hormones

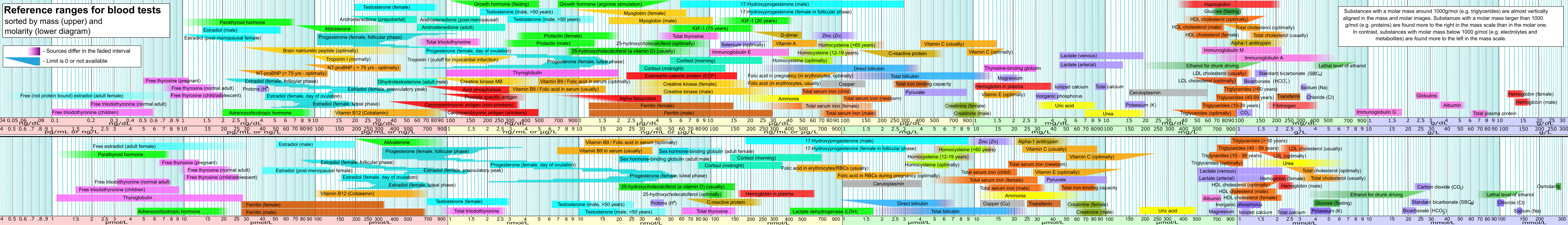
Reference ranges for blood tests, sorted by mass and molar concentration, with thyroid function tests marked in purple boxes in left half of diagram.

- Long-acting thyroid stimulator (LATS)
