= Pharmacokinetics simulation =

Simulation method used in drug development

Pharmacokinetics simulation is a simulation method used in determining the safety levels of a drug during its development.

== Purpose ==
Pharmacokinetics simulation gives an insight to drug efficacy and safety before exposure of individuals to the new drug that might help to improve the design of a clinical trial. Pharmacokinetics simulations help in addition in therapy planning, to stay within the therapeutic range under various physiological and pathophysiological conditions, e.g., chronic kidney disease.

== Simulators ==
Simcyp Simulator and GastroPlus (from Simulations Plus) are simulators that take account for individual variabilities. PharmaCalc v02 and PharmaCalcCL allow to simulate individual plasma-concentration time curves based on (published) pharmacokinetic parameters such as half-life, volume of distribution etc.
