= Thyrotoxicosis factitia =

- Specialty: Endocrinology

Thyrotoxicosis factitia (alimentary thyrotoxicosis, exogenous thyrotoxicosis) is a condition of thyrotoxicosis caused by the ingestion of exogenous thyroid hormone. It can be the result of mistaken ingestion of excess drugs, such as levothyroxine and triiodothyronine, or as a symptom of Munchausen syndrome. It is an uncommon form of hyperthyroidism.

Patients present with hyperthyroidism and may be mistaken for Graves' disease, if TSH receptor positive, or thyroiditis because of absent uptake on a thyroid radionuclide uptake scan due to suppression of thyroid function by exogenous thyroid hormones. Ingestion of thyroid hormone also suppresses thyroglobulin levels helping to differentiate thyrotoxicosis factitia from other causes of hyperthyroidism, in which serum thyroglobulin is elevated. Caution, however, should be exercised in interpreting thyroglobulin results without thyroglobulin antibodies, since thyroglobulin antibodies commonly interfere in thyroglobulin immunoassays causing false positive and negative results which may lead to clinical misdirection. In such cases, increased fecal thyroxine levels in thyrotoxicosis factitia may help differentiate it from other causes of hyperthyroidism.

== See also ==
- Foodborne illness
- Liothyronine
