= Euthyroid sick syndrome =

Endocrinological condition

- Other names: Sick euthyroid syndrome (SES); thyroid allostasis in critical illness, tumours, uremia and starvation (TACITUS); nonthyroidal illness syndrome (NTIS); low T_{3} low T_{4} syndrome
- Specialty: Endocrinology

Euthyroid sick syndrome (ESS) is a state of adaptation or dysregulation of thyrotropic feedback control wherein the levels of T3 or T4 are abnormal, but the thyroid gland does not appear to be dysfunctional. This condition may result from allostatic responses of hypothalamus-pituitary-thyroid feedback control, dyshomeostatic disorders, drug interferences, and impaired assay characteristics in critical illness.

The classical phenotype of this condition is often seen in starvation, critical illness, or patients in the intensive care unit. Similar endocrine phenotypes are observed in fetal life and in hibernating mammals. The most common hormone pattern in nonthyroidal illness syndrome is low total and free T3, elevated rT3, and normal T4 and TSH levels, although T4 and TSH suppression may occur in more severe or chronic illness. This classical pattern results from type 1 allostatic load, i.e. a stress response resulting from lacking energy, oxygen, and glutathione.

An alternative phenotype with a largely inverse hormonal pattern is seen in several physiological and pathological conditions, including pregnancy, obesity, endurance training, and psychiatric diseases. It is typically associated with high-T3 syndrome, increased plasma protein binding of thyroid hormones, and an elevated set point of the homeostatic system. It represents a response to type-2 allostatic load.

== Classical phenotype (type 1 thyroid allostasis) ==
=== Causes ===
Causes of classical euthyroid sick syndrome include a number of acute and chronic conditions, including pneumonia, fasting, starvation, anorexia nervosa, sepsis, trauma, cardiopulmonary bypass, malignancy, stress, heart failure, hypothermia, myocardial infarction, kidney failure, cirrhosis, diabetic ketoacidosis, surgery, infection, brain injury, shock, cancer, and HIV.

Outside the hospital setting, euthyroid sick syndrome (nonthyroidal illness syndrome - NTIS) has been assumed closely related with a series of chronic diseases, such as inflammatory bowel disease, chronic fatigue syndrome, and autoimmune diseases.

Additionally, an NTIS-like phenotype can be present in major depressive disorder, as well as overexercise.

=== Pathophysiology ===
In critical illness, the activity of different deiodinases is altered. Humoral and neuronal inputs at the level of the hypothalamus may adjust the set point of thyroid homeostasis. This may play an important role in the pathogenesis of the central component of thyroid allostasis in critical illness, tumors, uremia and starvation (TACITUS). In addition, both illness and medication (e.g. salicylates and heparin) may impair plasma protein binding of thyroid hormones, resulting in reduced levels of total hormones, while free hormone concentrations may be temporarily elevated.

Euthyroid sick syndrome probably represents an overlap of an allostatic response with pathologic reactions and drug interferences. Allostatic overload may result in wasting syndrome and myxedema coma. Thyroid storm, though, represents allostatic failure, where the organism is unable to develop NTIS in the situation of thyrotoxicosis.

==== Deiodinases ====
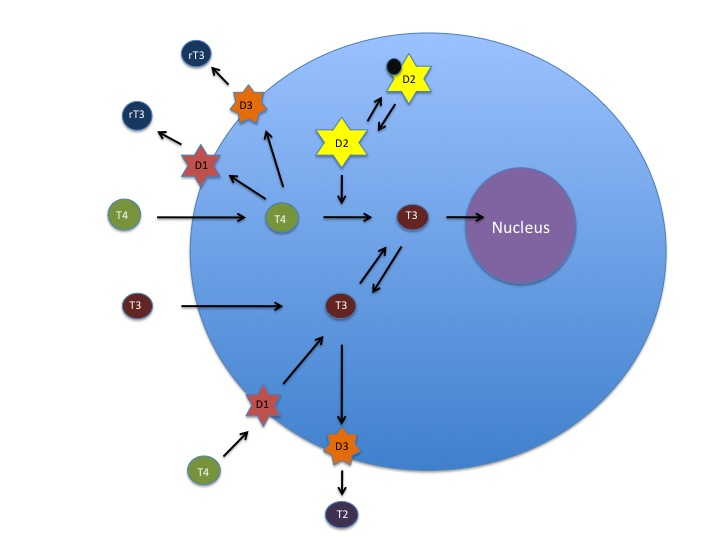
D1, D2, and D3 regulate the levels of T4, T3, and rT3.

Three primary deiodinases are responsible for thyroid hormone conversion and breakdown. Type 1 (D1) deiodinates T4 to the biologically active T3, as well as the hormonally inactive and possibly inhibitory rT3. Type 2 (D2) converts T4 into T3, and breaks down rT3. D3 produces rT3 from T4, and breaks down T3. The balance of D2 and D3 is important for overall T3/rT3 balance.

In NTIS, the concentrations of these deiodinases are altered, although whether NTIS is the cause or effect of this in peripheral tissues is unclear; in some studies, the alterations in thyroid hormone concentrations occurred before the changes in deiodinase activity. Typically, peripheral D1 and D2 are downregulated, while peripheral D3 is upregulated; this is associated with lower T4 and increased rT3.

==== Hypothalamic-pituitary-thyroid axis downregulation ====
Thyrotropin releasing hormone (TRH) neurons in the hypothalamus integrate global signals about the body's energy state. They may be stimulated by signals such as leptin, alpha-MSH, and catecholamines; and inhibited by glucocorticoids, neuropeptide Y, and agouti-related peptide.

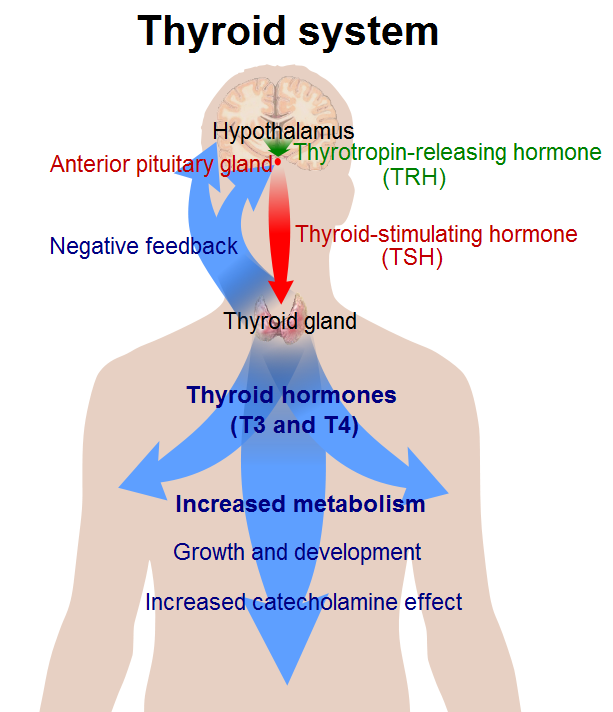
The HPT Axis.

In critical illness, inflammation increases tanycyte D2 in the paraventricular nucleus (PVN) of the hypothalamus, leading to local tissue hyperthyroidism. There may also be decreased central D3. This causes negative feedback on the HPT axis, and therefore reduced TRH gene expression in the PVN. This is exemplified by the common NTIS phenotype of low TSH even in the face of peripheral hypothyroidism.

==== Cytokines ====
Illness can cause inflammation, which often involves an increase in cytokines such as TNFa, IL-1, and IL-6. Cytokines are implicated in NTIS. IL-1β has been shown to decrease liver D1, as well as thyroid hormone receptor (THR) levels. IL-6 and TNFa downregulate D1 and suppress TSH, are negatively correlated with fT3, and are positively correlated with rT3. NF-κB also inhibits D1, and decreases the expression of Thyroid receptors α and β. IFNy inhibits thyroid and Tg release, and also inhibits the upregulation of TSH receptors.

==== Thyroid hormone receptors ====
In chronic liver and renal (kidney) failure, increased THR expression occurs. In contrast, in acute illness such as sepsis and trauma, decreased THR expression occurs.

==== Thyroid hormone transporters ====
During NTIS, alterations arise in the concentrations of thyroid hormone transporters such as MCT8 and MCT10, although whether the levels are increased or decreased depends on the study. The altered concentrations are thought to be a result of NTIS, rather than a cause; a study in rabbits showed that administering thyroid hormones normalized transporter expression.

==== Binding proteins ====
Decreased thyroxine-binding globulin (TBG) occurs following bypass surgery, and in chronic illness, a less effective form of TBG with lower affinity for thyroxine is synthesized. Reduced quantities of bound thyroid result, leading to decreased total thyroid measurements. Decreases in total thyroid may be more severe than alternations in free hormone levels.

==== Drugs ====
Dopamine and corticosteroids, commonly given in the hospital setting, can suppress TSH and suppress conversion of T4 to T3. Other drugs such as estrogen, contraceptives, salicylates, and phenytoin can alter the binding of TBG to TH, resulting in different TH concentrations. Additionally, lithium disrupts thyroid function, and thyromimetic endocrine disrupters may downregulate the HPT axis.

=== Fasting ===
Fasting is a common response in inflammation and critical illness. Originally, selenium deficiency as a result of malnutrition was thought to reduce D1 catalytic activity, but this theory has not been supported as a cause of NTIS.

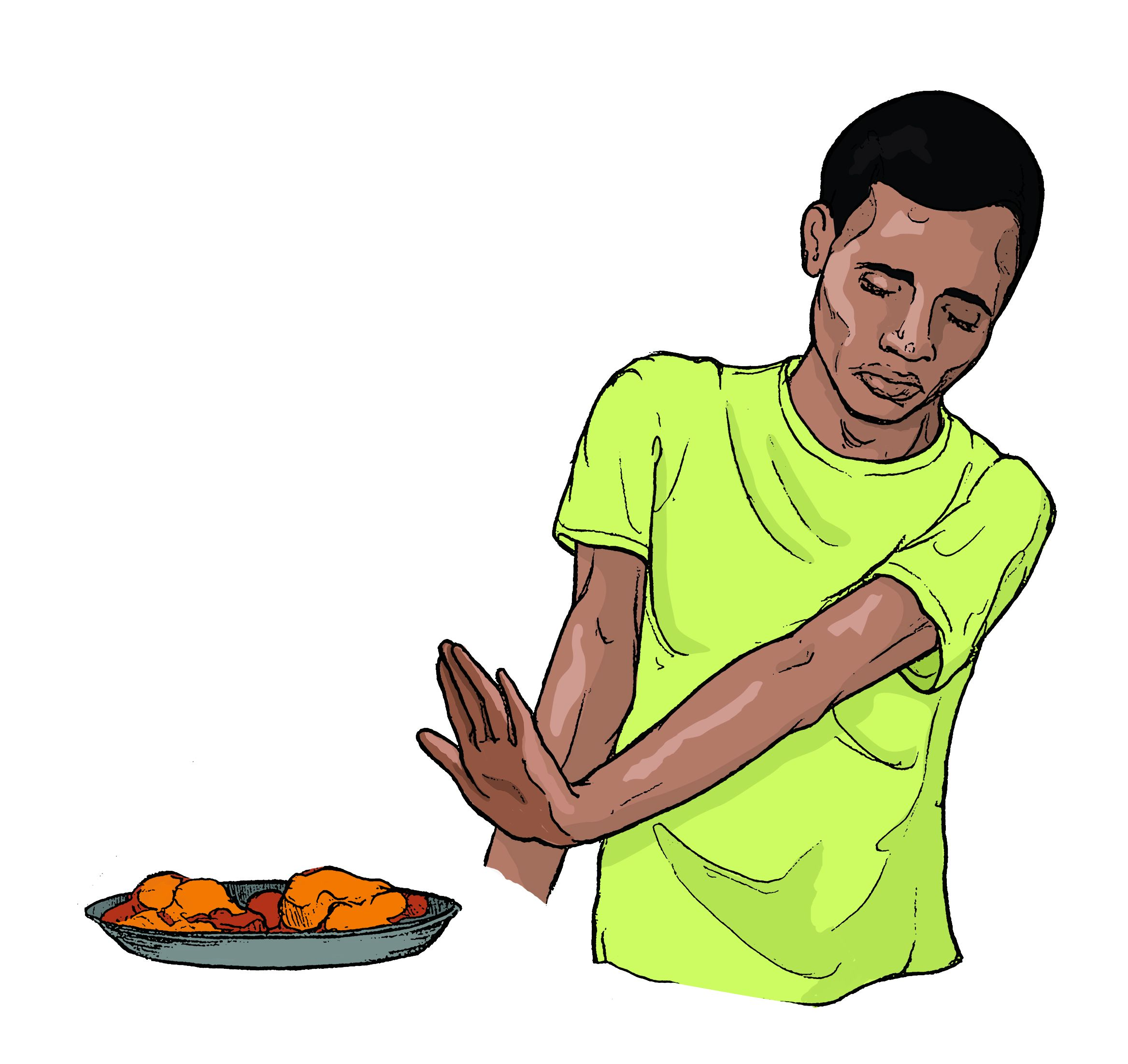
A fasting response is common in critical illness.

NTIS as a result of fasting may be regarded as a healthy and adaptive mechanism that reduces energy expenditure. Fasting in healthy, euthyroid people causes reduced T3 and elevated rT3, although TSH is usually unchanged. Even moderate weight loss can lower T3.

This may be primarily via reduced levels of leptin (the satisfaction hormone). Low leptin levels can downregulate hypothalamic TRH neurons and cause a reduction in TSH. Ιn fasting animals, administering leptin reverses NTIS symptoms and restores thyroid hormone concentrations. In obesity, increased leptin increases TSH and T3, and lowers rT3, possibly as an attempt to increase energy expenditure and return to weight set point.

Other signals associated with hunger also affect the HPT axis. Insulin and bile acids, which are elevated after a meal, lead to increased D2 activity, therefore increasing T3 and reducing rT3. Low leptin increases NPY and AGRP (associated with appetite), which inhibit TRH gene expression; this effect is enhanced by ghrelin (the hunger hormone). a-MSH stimulates TRH gene expression in the PVN. This is enhanced by leptin, and inhibited by low leptin. a-MSH is also antagonized by AGRP.

== Alternative phenotype (type 2 thyroid allostasis) ==
An anti-NTIS phenotype is observed in some circumstances, wherein TSH, T3, and T4 are generally elevated rather than suppressed. This can occur during pregnancy, obesity, cold adaptation, stay in high altitudes, endurance exercise, acute psychosis, and post-traumatic stress disorder.

According to newer theories, elevated concentrations of TSH and thyroid hormones in type 2 allostasis result from an up-regulated set point of the feedback loop, which ensues from increased TRH expression in the basolateral amygdala and the paraventricular nucleus of the hypothalamus in response to stress.

High-T3 syndrome in thyroid carcinoma may result from autonomous thyroid hormone secretion or overexpression of type 2 deiodinase in cancer cells rather than from type 2 allostasis.

== Conditions with mixed phenotypes ==
=== Psychiatry ===
Stress suppresses TSH, and alterations in thyroid hormone levels may arise in psychiatric illness. In major depressive disorder, an NTIS-like phenotype may be observed, with reduced T3 and increased rT3. T4 may be elevated, and TSH is usually normal, although TSH's normal circadian rhythm may be disrupted. Bipolar 1 and PTSD can exemplify an anti-NTIS phenotype, with upregulation of the HPT axis and increased T3. This may also occur during acute schizophrenic episodes.

=== Exercise ===
After exercise, a transient increase occurs in TSH, T4, and T3, but this is thought to be due to increased blood concentration as a result of dehydration. The effects normalize after rest. After long-term heavy strain, levels of thyroid hormones decrease. This is exacerbated by other stressors such as undernutrition and lack of sleep, such as in a military training setting. During endurance exercise, before exhaustion, elevated thyroid hormone levels may happen due to increased expected energy demand (type 2 allostatic load).

=== Environmental conditions ===
Cold exposure and stay at high altitude may lead to type 1 or type 2 phenotype, depending on duration and other boundary conditions (which determine whether or not stress is associated with energy deprivation).

== Diagnosis ==
Affected patients may have normal, low, or slightly elevated TSH depending on the spectrum and phase of illness. Total T4 and T3 levels may be altered by binding protein abnormalities, and medications. Reverse T3 levels are generally increased, while FT3 is decreased. FT4 levels may have a transient increase, before becoming subnormal during severe illness. Correspondingly, in the majority of cases calculated sum activity of peripheral deiodinases (SPINA-GD) is reduced. Generally the levels of free T3 will be lowered, followed by the lowering of free T4 in more severe disease. Several studies described elevated concentrations of 3,5-T2, an active thyroid hormone, in NTIS. 3,5-T2 levels were also observed to correlate with concentrations of rT3 (reverse T3) in patients with euthyroid sick syndrome.

NTIS is a component of a complex endocrine adaptation process, so affected patients might also have hyperprolactinemia and elevated levels of corticosteroids (especially cortisol) and growth hormone. NTIS can be difficult to distinguish from other forms of thyroid dysfunction in the hospital setting. Both NTIS and primary hypothyroidism may have reduced fT3 and fT4, and elevated TSH (which is common in the hospital, during the recovery phase of NTIS). Prescribing thyroxine to treat this may lead to lifelong thyroid overtreatment.

Hyperthyroidism may be assumed due to decreased TSH and a transient fT4 increase. In some cases, this can be distinguished from NTIS by a thyroid ultrasound, which is commonly available in the hospital intensive care unit.

NTIS looks similar to central hypopituitarism; both frequently have reduced TSH and thyroid hormone levels.

== Treatment ==
Debate is ongoing as to whether NTIS is an adaptive or maladaptive mechanism in response to physiological stress. Some sources indicate that NTIS is beneficial as an acute-phase response, but detrimental during the chronic phase of illness. Several trials have investigated a possible therapy for NTIS, but they yielded inconsistent and partly contradictory results. This may be due to the heterogeneity of investigated populations, and to the lack of a consistent definition of NTIS.

Administering exogenous T3 and T4 has variable results, but overall seems to confer no improvements to health outcome. Administering TRH to patients with chronic illness, however, seems to normalize thyroid levels and improve catabolic function.

When NTIS is caused by the normal fasting response to illness, early parenteral nutrition has been shown to attenuate alterations in thyroid hormone (TSH, T3, T4, rT3) levels, whereas late parenteral nutrition exacerbates it. Late parenteral nutrition, though, also reduced complications and accelerated recovery in one study.

== History ==
In 1968, a reduced T4 half-life in athletes was discovered. This was the first awareness of thyroid hormone concentration alterations that were not a result of thyroid gland or pituitary dysfunction. In 1971, they also found a transient increase in T4 during bicycle training.

In 1973, Rothenbuchner et al. discovered that starvation is correlated with reduced T3 concentration. Following this, a similar phenotype was noted in patients with critical illness, tumors, and uremia.

The alternative phenotype of type-2 thyroid allostasis was first predicted in 1968, when John W. Mason expected the concentrations of thyroid hormones to rise in situations of psychosocial stress. Mason's postulate was later confirmed by numerous studies.

== See also ==
- Thyroid storm
- Thyroid Function Test (TFT)
