= Thyroid hormone resistance =

- Other names: Resistance to thyroid hormone
- Regulation of thyroid hormone
- Specialty: Endocrinology

Thyroid hormone resistance (also resistance to thyroid hormone (RTH), and sometimes Refetoff syndrome) describes a rare syndrome in which the thyroid hormone levels are elevated but the thyroid stimulating hormone (TSH) level is not suppressed, or not completely suppressed as would be expected. The first report of the condition appeared in 1967. Essentially this is decreased end organ responsiveness to thyroid hormones. A new term "impaired sensitivity to thyroid hormone" has been suggested in March 2014 by Refetoff et al.

== Presentation ==
The syndrome can present with variable symptoms, even between members of the same family harboring the same mutation. Typically most or all tissues are resistant to thyroid hormone, so despite raised measures of serum thyroid hormone the individual may appear euthyroid (have no symptoms of over- or underactivity of the thyroid gland). The most common symptoms are goiter and tachycardia. It has also been linked to some cases of attention deficit hyperactivity disorder (ADHD), although the majority of people with that diagnosis have no thyroid problems. An association with depression has been proposed.

== Causes ==
Normal thyroid hormone function requires normal thyroid hormone transport across cell membrane, appropriate deiodination, thyroid hormone nuclear receptor, thyroid hormone response elements, co-activators, co-repressors, and normal histone acetylation. Any abnormalities in this chain can result in thyroid hormone resistance and it has not been as well studied as the various forms of insulin resistance.

The most well known cause of the syndrome are mutations of the β (beta) form (THRB gene) of the thyroid hormone receptor, of which over 100 different mutations have been documented. Mutations in MCT8 and SECISBP2 have also been associated with this condition.

== Regulation of thyroid hormone secretion ==
Hypothalamus secretes a hormone called thyrotropin releasing hormone (TRH) which in turn release thyroid stimulating hormone (TSH). TSH signals thyroid to secrete thyroid hormones thyroxine (T4) and triiodothyronine (T3). T4 gets converted to active T3 in peripheral tissues with the help of deiodinase enzymes. T4 and T3 negatively feedback on the pituitary and decrease TSH secretion.

== Diagnosis ==
The characteristic blood test results for this disorder can also be found in other disorders (for example TSH-oma (pituitary adenoma), or other pituitary disorders). The diagnosis may involve identifying a mutation of the thyroid receptor, which is present in approximately 85% of cases.

== Management ==
Beta blockers, like metoprolol, are sometimes used to help suppress symptoms such as tachycardia stemming from elevated serum TH levels. Compensatory increases in serum T4/T3 concentrations occurs in states of thyroid hormone resistance and are intended to increase TH availability at the cellular level. However, the high TH levels in serum can also produce complications related to sympathetic overactivity in the cardiovascular system or other tissues.

== Incidence ==
Thyroid hormone resistance syndrome is rare, incidence is variously quoted as 1 in 50,000 or 1 in 40,000 live births. Genetic mutations in the thyroid hormone beta receptor are the most common, with mutations in the alpha receptor being much more rare. More than 1000 individuals have been identified with thyroid hormone resistance, of which 85% had thyroid hormone beta receptor mutation.
