= Allostasis =

Biological concept

Allostasis (/ˌɑːloʊˈsteɪsɪs/) is a physiological mechanism of regulation in which an organism anticipates and adjusts its energy use according to environmental demands. First proposed by Peter Sterling and Joseph Eyer in 1988, the concept of allostasis shifts the focus away from the body maintaining a rigid internal set-point, as in homeostasis, to the brain's ability and role to interpret environmental stress and coordinate changes in the body using neurotransmitters, hormones, and other signaling mechanisms.

Allostasis is believed to be involved not only in the body's stress response and adaptation to chronic stress but also in the regulation of the immune system and the development of chronic diseases such as hypertension and diabetes.

== History ==
The concept of an organisms' ability to stabilize internal bodily mechanisms independently of environmental variations was first popularized by French physiologist Claude Bernard in 1849; he coined the constancy of the milieu intérieur (internal environment). He sought to replace the ancient Greek notion of vitalism that proposed the governing of the body through non-physical means with a physiological understanding of the mechanisms of the body through feedback and regulation. Harvard physiologist Walter Cannon took Bernard's theory of the milieu intérieur and expanded it to incorporate an evolutionary framework of energy efficiency and preservation. Cannon coined this concept homeostasis in 1926, demonstrating that the organism's body is a self-governing system of regulation with certain steady-state conditions for optimal functioning. By the late 20th-century, neurobiologist Peter Sterling and epidemiologist Joseph Eyer noticed generational patterns of chronic stress and its effects on various human physiological mechanisms that could not be easily explained by homeostasis. They developed the concept of 'allostasis' [from the Greek ἄλλος (állos, "other," "different") + στάσις (stasis, "standing still") to mean "remaining stable by being variable"] to incorporate the body's ability to adjust steady-state conditions based on the perception and interpretation of environmental stressors.

== Sterling and Eyer's model ==
In the 1970s, Sterling and Eyer were studying the 20th-century morbidity and mortality rates of age-specific cohorts in the United States and noticed a correlation between mortality rates of age-specific cohorts and the saturation of the labor market at the time the age-specific cohorts were entering the labor force. They discovered that the cohorts who entered the labor market during the Great Depression and the resulting economic boom in the 1940s had a lower increased mortality rate due to less job competition and insecurity compared to the cohorts prior to the 1930s and since the 1950s. They also noted a correlation of major stressful events, such as bereavement, divorce, unemployment, and migration, to a higher mortality rate. Despite a preconceived notion that a reduced mortality rate in a younger cohort would experience more chronic diseases later in age, Sterling and Eyer found contradictory evidence that younger cohorts with higher mortality rates actually experienced more chronic health problems such as cardiovascular disease later in life, following the trend of consistently increased morbidity and mortality rates throughout their generation. To explain these epidemiological phenomena, Sterling and Eyer suggested social and systemic stress in the setting of advancing capitalism and industrialization to be the main driver of increased morbidity and mortality rates in age-specific cohorts. These studies became the foundation of conceptualizing allostasis a decade later.

Sterling and Eyer proposed the concept of allostasis in 1988 to better explain the process of physiological changes in the individual level that are shaped by large-scale epidemiological patterns. They noticed a pattern that populations in the United States with the greatest impact of social disruption correlated with higher morbidity and mortality rates. For instance, the rate of elevated blood pressure (or hypertension) was the highest amongst groups that experienced the most social disruption, namely the unemployed and African Americans. Previous physiological explanations attributed this prevalence to African Americans being genetically predisposed to ineffective kidney filtration causing dysregulation of blood pressure; however, genetics could not explain why the high prevalence of hypertension was seen in African Americans but not in a close genetically related population of West Africans. Sterling and Eyer proposed that there was a mind-brain-body component to permanent physiological changes of the body's internal conditions in the setting of external stress.

=== Variance from homeostasis ===
Sterling and Eyer argued that homeostasis did not paint the whole picture of the body's physiological motives. Although individual organs and tissues when taken out of the body function homeostatically and exhibit their normal functioning with negative feedback, this is not always the case seen in organisms. Another example that does not completely follow homeostasis is blood pressure: if abiding by homeostasis, 24-hour blood pressure monitoring should show the body returning to its normal pressures through negative feedback whenever there is a deviance from optimal functioning. However, the human body exhibits a wide range of resting blood pressure numbers with no correction throughout the day depending on the environment, such as low pressures during sleep and higher pressures in the morning. Animal studies have also shown non-homeostatic patterns in times of arousal (or stress). The body elevates blood pressure during stress and returns to normal when the stressor is removed; yet, when the stress becomes chronic, the blood pressure may not return to normal and instead stay elevated.

=== Mechanism of action ===
Allostasis depends on the brain's ability to coordinate all of the organs' functions by innervating organ cells to perform a certain function as well as synthesizing and releasing signaling mechanisms, such as hormones and neurotransmitters. In response to stress, the brain directly innervates the thyroid and pancreas for energy regulation, sends signals to the cardiovascular system to increase cardiac output, stimulates the adrenal glands to release cortisol and aldosterone, and releases hormones from the pituitary gland such as ACTH to regulate urine output through the renin-angiotensin-aldosterone system. The brain is able to overcome negative feedback in these localized systems and continuously evaluate the body's internal set-points. By doing so, the body can regulate its resources and energy storage efficiently.

Another key component of allostasis is the brain's perception and subsequent adaptation to chronic stress. Sterling and Eyer theorized that the brain can anticipate stressors to prepare the body to respond adequately to environmental demands through classical conditioning. If the brain persistently interprets or even anticipates stress, then it may cause epigenetic changes to permanently adapt to a chronic state of arousal that results in physiological changes such as thickened blood vessels to support the increased cardiac output and down-regulation of stress hormone receptors.

=== Regulation of the immune system ===
The brain normally coordinates an immune response against a foreign threat that involves the synthesis, differentiation, and migration of immune cells, release of cytokines and interleukins, elevating the internal temperature set-point, and redirecting metabolic needs to support this effort. However, if the brain interprets an external stress demand as more urgent, it may supersede the immune and inflammatory responses and stimulate release of immune-suppressing stress hormones such as ACTH and cortisol. Once the stressor is resolved, the body resumes to mounting an adequate immune and inflammatory response, which may explain why it is often seen that a person falls ill after acute stress. Due to the interconnected nature of the brain's regulation of stress, the immune system, and the endocrine system, allostasis may play a role in the development of cancer.

== Application of concept ==
=== Allostatic load ===
Allostasis emphasizes that regulation must be efficient, whereas homeostasis makes no reference to efficiency. Prediction requires the brain to: (i) collect information across all spatial and temporal scales; (ii) analyze, integrate, and decide what will be needed; (iii) exert feedforward control of all parameters. Naturally, many needs are somewhat unpredictable, so errors are inevitable; and for those errors, homeostatic mechanisms – feedback control – are available to correct them. Allostatic (predictive) regulation allows the brain to prioritize needs, for example, by sending more oxygen and nutrients to organs that need it most. For this example, during peak exercise muscle requires an 18-fold increase in oxygenated blood, but the heart can increase its capacity only 3.5-fold. Therefore, the brain temporarily borrows blood from the digestive system and kidney rerouting it to muscle. It later repays the debt when muscle's increased need subsides. Without the ability to prioritize trade-offs between organ systems, the heart and lungs would need to be far larger while much of this costly extra capacity would go unused.

Every system evolves to operate over a particular range. For example, cone photoreceptors evolved to sense daylight over a 10,000-fold range of intensities, whereas rod photoreceptors evolved a different design to sense moonlight and starlight down to detection of single photons. To function optimally across their wide operating ranges, all systems adapt their sensitivities. A rod photoreceptor adapts to bright moonlight and requires minutes to increase its sensitivity to starlight. When a system is chronically forced beyond its intended operating range—as by chronic high carbohydrate diet or other stress—the limits of adaptation are exceeded, and systems break down. This condition was termed by neuroscientist Bruce McEwen as allostatic load. The health of an organism is maintained when operating within certain parameters, but having dynamic variability of range.

Too much allostasis, also known as allostatic overload, is when the body's attempts to adapt to the environment cause more harm than benefit and can lead to various negative consequences in the form of mental and physical diseases. From a metaphorical perspective this can be interpreted as a machine running continuously as the machine is overworked; it becomes less efficient over time because more stress is placed on it. Similarly, the process of allostasis becomes less efficient at managing the body's resources when the body endures increased levels of unhealthy stress due to wear and tear on the body and the brain. An increase in allostatic load can impair and reduce neuroplasticity as stress causes the brain to age quicker. This is because with more stress, more synaptic connections are lost in the prefrontal cortex which is responsible for body regulation.

==== Types ====
McEwen and endocrinologist John C. Wingfield proposed two types of allostatic overload which result in different responses:

1. Type 1 allostatic overload occurs when energy demand exceeds supply, resulting in activation of the emergency life history stage. This serves to direct the animal away from normal life history stages into a survival mode that decreases allostatic load and regains positive energy balance. The normal life cycle can be resumed when the perturbation passes.
2. Type 2 allostatic overload begins when there is sufficient or even excess energy consumption accompanied by social conflict and other types of social dysfunction. The latter is the case in human society and certain situations affecting animals in captivity. In all cases, secretion of glucocorticoids and activity of other mediators of allostasis such as the autonomic nervous system, CNS neurotransmitters, and inflammatory cytokines wax and wane with allostatic load. If allostatic load is chronically high, then pathologies develop. Type 2 allostatic overload does not trigger an escape response, and can only be counteracted through learning and changes in the social structure.

Whereas both types of allostasis are associated with increased release of cortisol and catecholamines, they differentially affect thyroid homeostasis: Concentrations of the thyroid hormone triiodothyronine are decreased in type 1 allostasis, but elevated in type 2 allostasis. This may result from type 2 allostatic load increasing the set point of pituitary-thyroid feedback control.

=== Paradigm of allostatic orchestration ===
Sung Lee introduced the paradigm of allostatic orchestration (PAO), extending the principle of allostasis by stating, "The PAO originates from an evolutionary perspective and recognizes that biological set points change in anticipation of changing environments."

The brain is the organ of central command, orchestrating cross-system operations to support optimal behavior at the level of the whole organism. The PAO describes differences between homeostasis and allostasis paradigms and conciliation of the paradigms illustrated with alternative views of post-traumatic stress disorder (PTSD). Lee states:

The allostatic state represents the integrated totality of brain-body interactions. Health itself is an allostatic state of optimal anticipatory oscillation, hypothesized to relate to the state of criticality… Diseases are allostatic states of impaired anticipatory oscillations, demonstrated as rigidifications of set points across the brain and body (disease comorbidity).

The PAO implications for health extend beyond blood pressure and diabetes to include addiction, depression, and deaths of despair (from alcohol, drugs, and suicide) that have been increasing since 2000, emphasizing that an integrated view of health includes environmental context. Allostasis encourages increased attention to new solutions at the level of society, as well as the individual and immediate community.

=== Role in evolutionary development ===
An evolutionary perspective of allostasis includes the development of the brain. Lisa Feldman Barrett, a neuroscientist and professor of psychology, argues that during evolution, organisms' internal systems became much more advanced, and continuing to just have several groups of cells would have poorly managed these new systems that these bodies were acquiring. A brain was needed instead because its large size is much more capable of efficient management. However, in rare cases animal species do not rely on brains nor a similar allostatic process. The sea squirt is one example because once the larvae have fully grown they "absorb their brain." The sea squirt's allostatic process would not be as complex as a human's for example since both species have ecological niches that are of different complexities (i.e. "All animals have brains that are adapted to their environmental niches and life cycles").

== Nature of concept ==
Allostasis proposes a broader hypothesis than homeostasis: The key goal of physiological regulation is not rigid constancy; rather, it is flexible variation that anticipates the organism's needs and promptly meets them. Rather than simply responding to the environment, allostasis utilizes predictive regulation, which has a more complex goal in evolution of adaptation by changing based on what it anticipates, rather than by staying the same or "in balance" in response to environmental changes, as homeostasis suggests. This places homeostasis as a function within allostasis; however, some argue it is a larger paradigm altogether. Allostasis redefines health and disease beyond the stable measures from lab tests or blood pressure, for example; and expands it to define health as the flexibility of these values. Blood pressure is one of Sterling's prime examples of a health measure that is best when it can fluctuate in anticipation of the brain-body's expected demands, so it can match this demand. The alternative, or a less healthy state on the health-disease continuum, would be for blood pressure to remain the same, or "stable," and not meet the new demand. Allostatic regulation reflects, at least partly, cephalic involvement in primary regulatory events, in that it is anticipatory to systemic physiological regulation.

Wingfield states:

The concept of allostasis, maintaining stability through change, is a fundamental process through which organisms actively adjust to both predictable and unpredictable events... Allostatic load refers to the cumulative cost to the body of allostasis, with allostatic overload... being a state in which serious pathophysiology can occur... Using the balance between energy input and expenditure as the basis for applying the concept of allostasis, two types of allostatic overload have been proposed.

Sterling (2004) proposed several interrelated points that constitute the allostasis model:

1. Organisms are designed to be efficient.
2. Efficiency requires a brain to predict what will be needed and avoid costly errors.
3. The brain further enhances efficiency by prioritizing needs and enforcing trade-offs.
4. All systems, including the brain, organ systems, and single cells are designed for a particular operating range. (Example, cone photoreceptors adapt for daylight, and rod photoreceptors adapt for moonlight and starlight).
5. A system's parameters vary according to predicted demand and adapt their sensitivities.
6. While a wide range denotes a flexible and healthy system, when their evolved operating ranges are chronically exceeded, systems at all levels break down.

== Clinical significance ==
Allostasis occurs at the cellular and systems levels. When humans are chronically stressed, the brain chronically raises blood pressure; then arterial muscles predict higher pressure and respond with hypertrophy (like skeletal muscles when we lift weights). Gradually the whole cardiovascular system adapts to life at an elevated pressure level. This is known as chronic hypertension, which elevates mortality from cardiovascular disease and stroke. Similarly, a chronically high carbohydrate diet requires chronically high blood glucose and leads to chronically high levels of insulin that increase in anticipation of the need to manage the high level of carbohydrates. Cells that express insulin receptors, predicting high insulin, adapt by reducing their sensitivity (like photoreceptors in bright light). This leads to type 2 diabetes and elevated mortality from many causes. Although physicians term this response insulin resistance, it can be better understood as consequent to predictive regulation.

Allostasis can be carried out by means of alteration in HPA axis hormones, the autonomic nervous system, cytokines, or a number of other systems, and is generally adaptive in the short term. Allostasis is essential in order to maintain internal viability amid changing conditions.

Allostasis provides compensation for various problems, such as in compensated heart failure, compensated kidney failure, and compensated liver failure. However, such allostatic states are inherently fragile, and decompensation can occur quickly, as in acute decompensated heart failure.

== Related terms ==
The term heterostasis is also used in place of allostasis, particularly where state changes are finite in number and therefore discrete (e.g. computational processes).

== See also ==
- Homeostasis
