= PTPRN2 =

Protein-coding gene in the species Homo sapiens

Identifiers
- Aliases: PTPRN2, IA-2beta, IAR, ICAAR, PTPRP, R-PTP-N2, protein tyrosine phosphatase, receptor type N2, protein tyrosine phosphatase receptor type N2
- External IDs: OMIM: 601698; MGI: 107418; GeneCards: PTPRN2
Available structures
PDB	Ortholog search: PDBe RCSB
PDB	List of PDB id codes 2QEP, 4HTI, 4HTJ
Enzyme activity
EC #	BRENDA	ExPASy	KEGG	MetaCyc
3.1.3.48	↗	↗	↗	↗

Gene location (Human)
Chr.	Chromosome 7 (human)
Band	7q36.3	Start	157,539,056 bp
Band	7q36.3	End	158,587,823 bp

Gene location (Mouse)
Chr.	Chromosome 12 (mouse)
Band	12 F2|12 62.65 cM	Start	116,449,340 bp
Band	12 F2|12 62.65 cM	End	117,240,469 bp
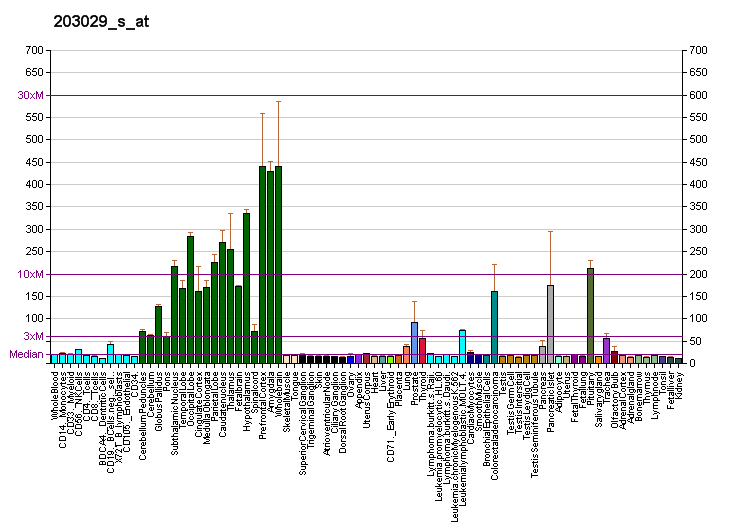

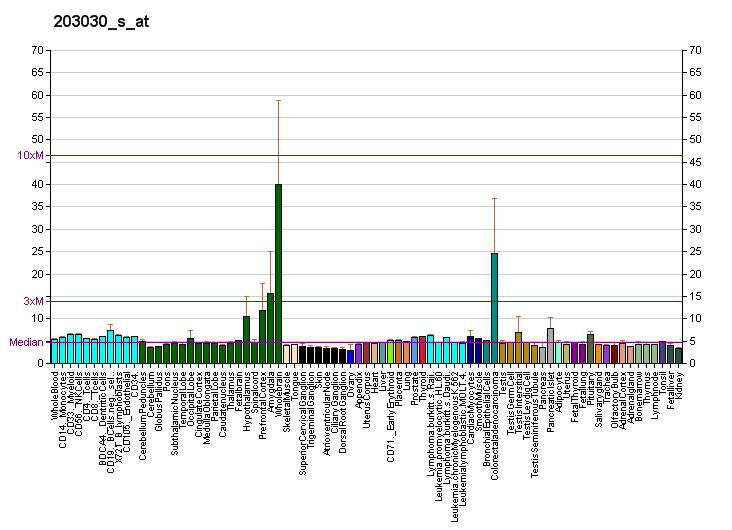

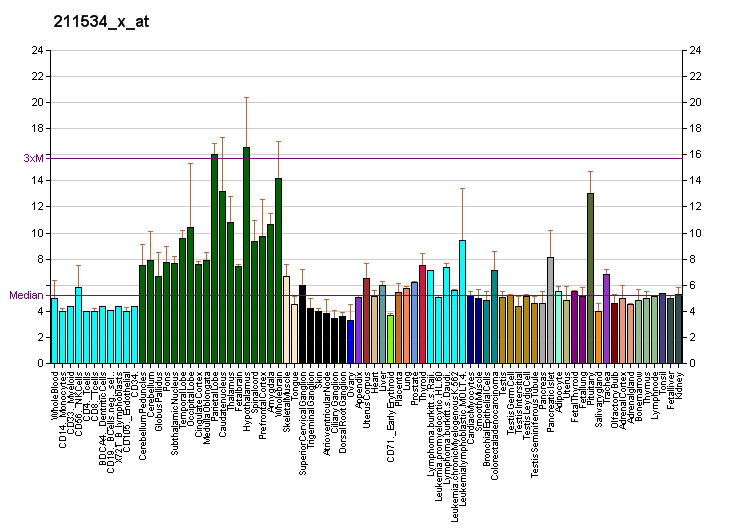
RNA expression pattern
Bgee	Human / Mouse (ortholog); Top expressed in: lateral nuclear group of thalamus; middle temporal gyrus; external globus pallidus; Brodmann area 23; entorhinal cortex; orbitofrontal cortex; frontal pole; superior frontal gyrus; Brodmann area 46; postcentral gyrus / Top expressed in: dentate gyrus of hippocampal formation granule cell; superior frontal gyrus; primary visual cortex; primordial pancreas; neural layer of retina; cerebellar cortex; endocrine pancreas; islet of Langerhans; zygote; morula; More reference expression data
BioGPS	More reference expression data
Gene ontology
Molecular function	phosphoprotein phosphatase activity; phosphatase activity; protein tyrosine phosphatase activity; transmembrane receptor protein tyrosine phosphatase activity; hydrolase activity
Cellular component	cytoplasm; integral component of membrane; endoplasmic reticulum lumen; secretory granule membrane; membrane; receptor complex; transport vesicle membrane; synapse; integral component of plasma membrane; synaptic vesicle membrane; secretory granule; cell junction; terminal bouton; cytoplasmic vesicle; plasma membrane; ficolin-1-rich granule membrane; integral component of synaptic vesicle membrane
Biological process	protein dephosphorylation; negative regulation of GTPase activity; dephosphorylation; insulin secretion involved in cellular response to glucose stimulus; peptidyl-tyrosine dephosphorylation; neurotransmitter secretion; lipid metabolism; neutrophil degranulation
Sources:Amigo / QuickGO
Orthologs
Databases	NCBI: entry; OMA: entry
Species	Human	Mouse
Entrez	5799	19276
Ensembl	ENSG00000155093; ENSG00000282185	ENSMUSG00000056553
UniProt	Q92932	P80560
RefSeq (mRNA)	NM_001308267; NM_001308268; NM_002847; NM_130842; NM_130843	NM_011215
RefSeq (protein)	NP_001295196; NP_001295197; NP_002838; NP_570857; NP_570858	NP_035345
Location (UCSC)	Chr 7: 157.54 – 158.59 Mb	Chr 12: 116.45 – 117.24 Mb
PubMed search
- Wikidata
View/Edit Human	View/Edit Mouse

Receptor-type tyrosine-protein phosphatase N2 (R-PTP-N2) also known as islet cell autoantigen-related protein (ICAAR) and phogrin is an enzyme that in humans is encoded by the PTPRN2 gene. PTPRN and PTPRN2 (this gene) are both found to be major autoantigens associated with insulin-dependent diabetes mellitus.

== Function ==
Due to a close similarity in the gene sequences, the protein encoded by this gene has traditionally been considered a member of the protein tyrosine phosphatase (PTP) family. PTPs are known to be signaling molecules that regulate a variety of cellular processes including cell growth, differentiation, mitotic cycle, and oncogenic transformation. However, recent research has shown that the PTPRN2 mouse homolog, known as phogrin, dephosphorylates the lipid phosphatidylinositol rather than tyrosine. Specifically, phogrin was shown to act upon phosphatidylinositol 3-phosphate and Phosphatidylinositol 4,5-diphosphate, whereas it has never been observed acting upon tyrosine. PTPRN2 should, therefore, be more accurately considered a PIPase rather than a PTPase. Phosphorylated forms of phosphatidylinositol (PI) are called phosphoinositides and play important roles in lipid signaling, cell signaling and membrane trafficking.

The protein produced by PTPRN2 possesses an extracellular region, a single transmembrane region, and a single intracellular catalytic domain, and thus represents a receptor-type PTP. The catalytic domain of this PTP is most closely related to PTPRN, also known as IA-2.

== Gene ==
Three alternatively spliced transcript variants of this gene, which encode distinct proteins, have been reported.

== Interactions ==
PTPRN2 has been shown to interact with: CKAP5, SPTBN4, and UBQLN4.

== Clinical significance ==
R-PTP-N2 functions as an autoantigen in diabetes mellitus type 1.
