= Insulitis =

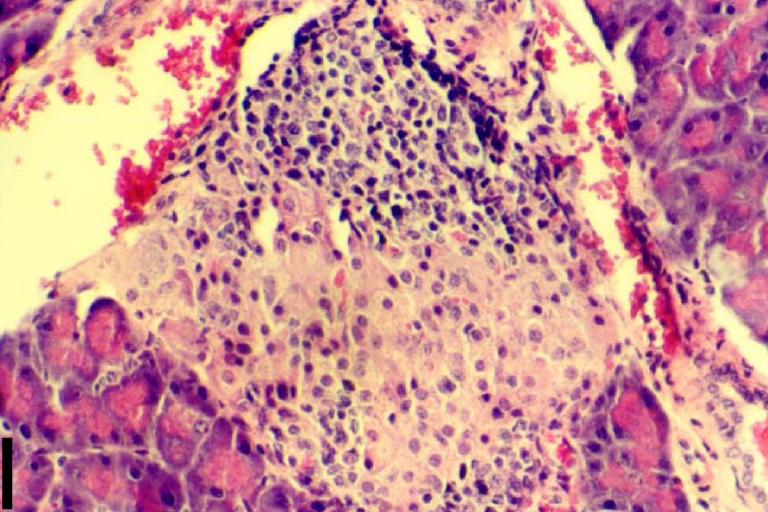
- A histological image of an inflammatory infiltration of the islets of Langerhans of the pancreas
- Pronunciation: ˌɪnsjʊˈlʌɪtɪs
- Specialty: Endocrinology
- Complications: Can lead to loss of beta cell function and can lead to type 1 diabetes
- Causes: Immune cell infiltration in islets of langerhans
- Management: islet cell transplantation
- Frequency: Found in 19% of people with T1D and 28% of people with T2D

Insulitis is an inflammation of the islets of Langerhans, a collection of endocrine tissue located in the pancreas that helps regulate glucose levels, and is classified by specific targeting of immune cell (T and B lymphocytes, macrophages and dendritic cells) infiltration in the islets of Langerhans. This immune cell infiltration can result in the destruction of insulin-producing beta cells of the islets, which plays a major role in the pathogenesis, the disease development, of type 1 and type 2 diabetes. Insulitis is present in 19% of individuals with type 1 diabetes and 28% of individuals with type 2 diabetes. It is known that genetic and environmental factors contribute to insulitis initiation, however, the exact process that causes it is unknown. Insulitis is often studied using the non-obese diabetic (NOD) mouse model of type 1 diabetes. The chemokine family of proteins may play a key role in promoting leukocytic infiltration into the pancreas prior to pancreatic beta-cell destruction.

== Pathophysiology ==
The pathogenesis of insulitis can be assessed based on the threshold of CD3+ or CD45+ cells surrounding or infiltrating the islets of Langerhans, however, this can only be studied with a pancreatic tissue sample. CD3+ and CD45+ (cluster of differentiation 3 & 45 positive cells) are lymphocytes. Studying non-obese diabetic mice has revealed a correlation between insulitis progression and quantity of insulin autoantibodies production in the blood circulation, as well as a link between certain combinations of present autoantibodies and risk for developing type 1 diabetes and insulitis.

Insulitis, which is present in roughly 19% of type 1 diabetes patients, most prominently occurs in the first year after diagnosis in patients aged 0 to 14 years with a prevalence of 68% (32/47 patients studied). Insulitis prevalence is 4% in young patients with chronic type 1 diabetes (patients who have had the disease for over a year). Only 29% of older patients aged 15 to 39 have shown insulitic lesion within a year after diagnosis. The exact reason for this disparity between age groups is unknown, however it is theorised that adults may have a different or less severe form of type 1 diabetes that progresses slower.

There are 2 different sub-classifications of insulitis, peri-insulitis and intra-insulitis, that differ based on the location of immune cell infiltration. In peri-insulitis, cell infiltration occurs in the periphery of the islets, whereas in intra-insulitis has cell infiltration in the parenchyma, the functional tissue, of the islet. Often, in peri-insulitis, cell infiltration in concentration at 1 pole of the islet.

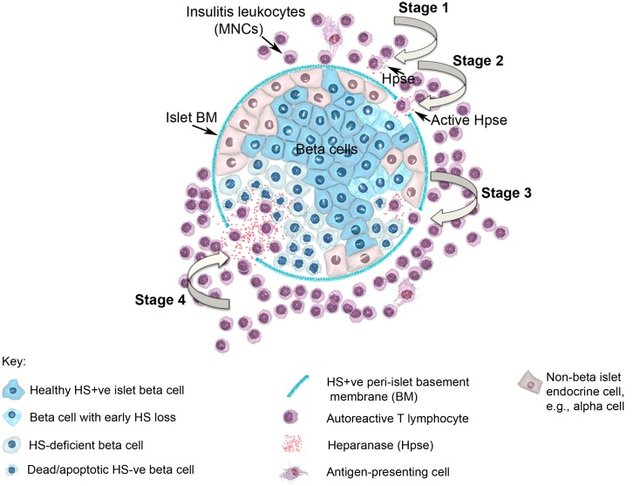
Diagram showing a pancreatic islet and four stages of T1D disease driven by heparanase and loss of intra-islet glycosaminoglycan heparan sulfate (HS)

== Diagnosis ==
There is a significant correlation between insulitis frequency and CD45+, CD3+, CD4+, CD8+, and CD20+ cells within an insulitis lesion, and the general consensus within the scientific community is that a lesion in the islets of Langerhans can be diagnosed as insulitis if it meets the minimum threshold of at least 3 islets infiltrated, each with a minimum of 15 CD45+ cells. One study that was aiming to find the frequency of individuals with type 2 diabetes who fulfilled the insulitis diagnostic requirements found that the current definition and requirements of insulitis could not be used to “distinguish pancreases retrieved from individuals with type 1 diabetes from those with type 2 diabetes,” (Lundberg et al., 2017). This study proposed changing the accepted definition of insulitis to have a positive diagnosis occur when “≥ 15 CD3+ cells, not CD45+ cells, are found in ≥ 3 islets,” (Lundberg et al., 2017) and doing so decreased the percentage of type 2 diabetic patients meeting the criteria for insulitis from 82% to 28%.

A primary challenge to studying the pathogenesis of insulitis and type 1 and 2 diabetes is due to the lack of an agreement in the definition and diagnostic conditions of insulitis. This lack of consensus exists because there are many different immunophenotyping markers and cell infiltrate thresholds used to distinguish insulitis from other inflammatory conditions, and due to the small sample size available to study, there is lots of research focused on more clearly identifying the characteristics of insulitis.

Due to the islets of Langerhans being small clusters of cells in the pancreas, it is difficult to study and diagnose insulitis as it requires a pathology report to be taken on donor samples of islets of Langerhans tissue, and as of 2014, there was only histopathological data from ~250 cases. A strategy to test for early type 1 diabetes development, and the likely development of insulitis, is by taking a blood test to measure the islet autoantibody level in a person's circulation. Diagnosis of insulitis can also occur from imaging the insulitis lesions using radiological imaging or optical imaging techniques, however the main difficulty with diagnosing insulitis from images is due to the difficulty of detecting the pancreatic islets within the tissue of the pancreas. Radiological imaging techniques include magnetic resonance imaging (MRI), ultrasound, and CT scanning.

== Treatment ==
=== Immunosuppressant therapy given early in insulitis development ===
This treatment would be effective if it was administered early in the development of insulitis. If insulitis and type 1 diabetes development was successfully detected in a non-invasive method prior to the extensive loss of insulin secreting beta cells, the administration of immunosuppressant therapy would prevent the immune cell infiltration into the islets of langerhans. This prevention of insulitis would also serve as a prevention of type 1 diabetes development because if there is no insulin-producing beta cell destruction, the body will be able to produce sufficient levels of glucose.

=== Allogeneic pancreatic islet cell transplantation ===
In this surgical procedure, pancreatic islet cells are obtained from brain-dead donors (often 2 donors are required) and infused into the patient's liver to replace the destroyed islets in the patient. The patient is also started on immunosuppressant therapy to prevent the patient's immune system from damaging the transplanted cells. The transplant takes place under local anesthesia, and an image-guided catheter is inserted percutaneously into the portal vein, a blood vessel that transports blood to the liver. The first reported transplantation took place in 1977. The procedure shows short-term success with some evidence of long-term success. When successful, this procedure results in significantly improved diabetic control and a reduction in hypoglycemic episodes, indicating the implanted insulin-producing beta cells of the islets successfully produce and secrete insulin at the required levels. In a registry study of 112 patients, the islet transplantation failed in 13% of patients, and 76% of patients were insulin-dependent within 2 years of the procedure. The low success rate of a transplant could be due to inadequate numbers of islet cells implanted, engraftment failure of islet cells, islet cell damage in the liver, ineffective immunosuppression, and recurrent autoimmune diabetes. Serious complications may arise from this procedure, however, a majority of transplantation procedures result in no adverse effects for patients. There is also a risk of adverse effects resulting from long-term use of immunosuppressant therapy. While success rates for this procedure have been going up since it was first performed, this procedure is often not offered due to the high rate of rejection by the patient's body and the long-term risk of immunosuppressant therapy.

=== Autologous pancreatic islet cell transplantation ===
This surgical procedure is similar to the allogeneic pancreatic islet cell transplantation, with the major difference being where the implanted pancreatic islets are obtained from. In an autologous pancreatic islet cell transplantation, islet cells are obtained from the patient, whereas in the allogeneic pancreatic islet cell transplantation islet cells were obtained from donors.

This procedure is performed along with a pancreatectomy under general anesthesia. First, the pancreatectomy is performed, with the full pancreas only being removed in more extreme cases such as from debilitating pain from chronic pancreatitis, then viable islet cells are isolated and implanted into a patient's liver via the portal vein with an image-guided catheter. Because the implanted islet cells come from the patient's body, there is no immune rejection and no need for immunosuppressant therapy.

This procedure shows short-term success in improving patient blood-sugar management, but in the long-term most patients end up needing insulin therapy. Complications that arise from this procedure primarily arise from the pancreatectomy.

== History ==
Insulitis was first described in 1902 by German pathologist Martin Benno Schmidt and later labelled insulitis by Swiss pathologist Hanns von Meyenburg in 1940. Schmidt observed inflammation caused by lymphocytic infiltration in the islets of Langerhans in the periphery of islets (peri-insulitis) in a 10-year-old diabetic child. Insulitis was believed to be a rare condition until 1928 when scientists Oliver Stansfield and Shields Warren discovered the correlation between insulitis and patient age in their study of several young diabetic children who died shortly after their diabetes diagnosis. Young patients were the primary focus of their research due to children having the “best examples of pure, uncomplicated diabetes mellitus,” (In't Veld, 2011) and having fewer complications that arise with age. In addition to connecting insulitis to age, Stansfield and Warren found a correlation between insulitis and sudden onset (<1 year) of type 1 diabetes. Warren also observed that insulitis was not always present in patients with diabetes, with him concluding that since insulitis was not found in simple cases of diabetes, insulitis was not causing diabetes, it was merely a symptom of it.

In 1958, Philip LeCompte reexamined acute onset disease and short duration by studying 4 related insulitis cases. LeCompte theorised that insulitis was a rare, but significant lesion that may have been under-diagnosed, and the cellular infiltrate could be caused by an infection agent, a functional strain of the islets, a reaction to damage from a nonbacterial source, or an antigen-antibody reaction. In 1965, pathologist Willy Gepts speculated about the possible immunological origin insulitis may have had when he published the first analysis on insulitis and juvenile diabetes with a relatively large sample size, 22 patients. All 22 patients studied had all died within 6 months of diagnosis and Gepts found the presence of insulitis in 68% (15/22) of the patients, which was significant as it showed a much higher prevalence than previously discovered. In a follow-up study, Gepts also found a highly-variable pancreatic beta-cell mass reduction, averaging ~10% less than what was found in non-diabetic controls, a tendency for inflammation to be found in islets that still had insulin immunoreactivity, and further evidence of an autoimmune process at work. Further study in 1978 led Gepts to the conclusion that “insulitis represents an immune reaction of the delayed type, specifically directed against beta-cells,”(In’t Veld, 2011). Studies on pancreatic disease from the 1920s to 1970s revealed many things about insulitis, and when combines with immunologic and genetic studies on patients with type 1 diabetes pointed towards a connection between insulitis and type 1 diabetes, and an autoimmune basis for type 1 diabetes.
