= Bernhard J. Hering =

Bernhard J. Hering is professor of surgery and medicine and executive director of the Schulze Diabetes Institute at the University of Minnesota, where he serves as Vice Chair of Translational Medicine in the Medical School's Department of Surgery and where he holds the McKnight Presidential Chair in Transplantation Science and the Jeffrey Dobbs and David Sutherland, MD, PhD Chair in Diabetes Research.

== Biography ==
He received his medical degree in 1983 at Justus Liebig University Medical School, in Giessen, Germany, where he also did his residency in internal medicine, followed by training in endocrinology. He joined the faculty at the University of Minnesota Medical School in 1996.

== Academic work ==
Hering is an internationally renowned leader in the field of islet cell transplantation, with his research focusing on innovating and implementing cell-based therapeutics into specialty care biologics for diabetes. The human islet transplant protocol that Dr. Hering and his team have refined has markedly improved short-term and long-term clinical outcomes in patients with type 1 diabetes; key elements of this protocol have been adopted for the Phase 3 licensure trial of human islets by the National Institutes of Health (NIH)-sponsored multi-center Clinical Islet Transplant Consortium.

For islet transplantation to become a premier treatment option for type 1 diabetes, a widely available cell source and a safe rejection prophylaxis are required. Hering's research group has addressed both requirements. Widely recognized as a pioneer in islet xenotransplantation, Hering and his team demonstrated that xenogeneic, porcine donor-derived islets can be utilized as a cell source for transplant in diabetes. His research group was the first to demonstrate long-term diabetes reversal after adult porcine islet xenotransplants in nonhuman primates, an accomplishment that has reinvigorated the field of xenotransplantation. Hering co-founded Spring Point Project, an organization established to generate designated pathogen-free, ‘medical-grade’ source pigs for planned clinical translation of islet xenotransplantation. To eliminate the need for recipient immunosuppression, Hering has collaborated with Drs. Singh, Ramachandran, and Graham at the University of Minnesota and Drs. Luo and Miller at Northwestern University and others to develop the first strategy to induce reliably and safely stable immune tolerance of transplants in any stringent preclinical model that does not require same donor bone marrow transplantation with its intense conditioning regimen. This strategy involves the peritransplant administration of apoptotic donor leukocytes under short-term immunosuppression and, unlike strategies that involve same donor bone marrow or hematopoietic stem cell transplantation, is consistently effective in nonhuman primates even without requiring irradiation, indiscriminate T cell depletion, myelosuppression, and calcineurin inhibition in transplant recipients, thereby pointing to a clinically applicable path toward immune tolerance of islet allografts and possibly also solid organ allografts. To extend these findings to induction of immune tolerance to porcine islet cell and organ xenografts, Hering is partnering with investigators with expertise in gene editing of porcine donors to integrate preemptive treatments with apoptotic donor leukocytes and genetic engineering of porcine donors into a safe and successful rejection prophylaxis for wide application in porcine to human xenotransplantation.

He has been invited to advise the Food and Drug Administration (FDA) and the National Institute of Health (NIH) on issues related to xenotransplantation and cellular therapies for diabetes. He has sat on the editorial boards of several professional journals and is the author or co-author of 25 book chapters and of over 300 articles, including articles in Nature, Nature Medicine, Nature Communications, Proceedings of the National Academy of Sciences, New England Journal of Medicine, and the Journal of the American Medical Association.

Hering has been a long-term member of the steering committees of the NIH Immune Tolerance Network, NIH Clinical Islet Transplant Consortium, NIH Nonhuman Primate Transplantation Tolerance Collaborative Study Group, and NIH Type 1 Diabetes TrialNet; he currently serves on the steering committee of the NIH Nonhuman Primate Transplantation Tolerance Collaborative Study Group. Hering is also the medical director of the NIH Collaborative Islet Transplant Registry (CITR). He served as president of the Cell Transplant Society, president of the International Xenotransplantation Association (IXA), and as president of the International Pancreas and Islet Transplant Association (IPITA).

In recognition for his outstanding contributions to islet transplantation, Hering was named by U.S. News & World Report and Castle Connolly Medical Ltd. one of America's Top Doctors, a distinction reserved for the top 1% of physicians across the U.S. for their specialty. Additional honors include the Paul E. Lacy Memorial Lecture Award from The International Pancreas and Islet Transplant Association in 2023, the most prestigious international recognition in the field of cell therapy for diabetes.
