= Charles Pybus =

Charles Pybus may refer to:

- Frederick Charles Pybus (1883–1975), English surgeon
- Charles Small Pybus (1766–1810), English barrister and politician
