= IA2 =

IA2 or similar may refer to:

- Iowa Highway 2, a state highway which runs across southern Iowa
- Iowa's 2nd congressional district, a congressional district in the U.S. state of Iowa
- Italian Astronomical Archives Center, an archive of astronomical data
- IMBEL IA-2, a rifle design being evaluated by the Brazilian Army
- Islet antigen-2, a protein in the human pancreas
