= Benno Schmidt =

Benno Schmidt may refer to:

- Martin Benno Schmidt (1863–1949), German pathologist
- Benno C. Schmidt Sr. (1913–1999), American lawyer and venture capitalist
- Benno C. Schmidt Jr. (born 1942), American academic and education executive
