= Ille Gebeshuber =

Austrian physicist

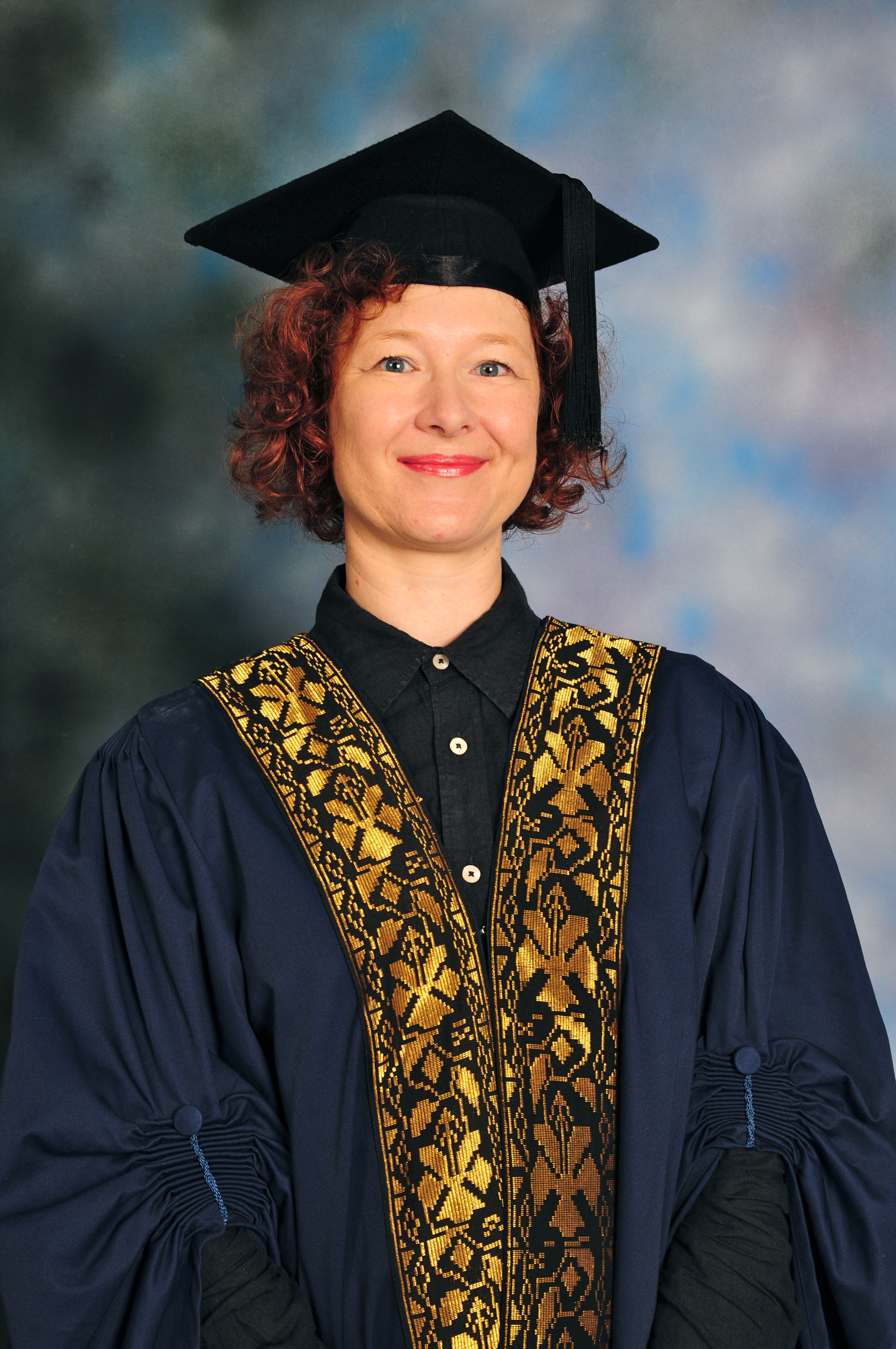
- Ille C. Gebeshuber (public domain image)
- Born: 10 April 1969 (age 57); Bruck an der Mur, Austria
- Education: Vienna University of Technology
- Known for: Nanophysics
- Scientific career
- Fields: Physicist
- Workplaces: Vienna University of Technology; Universiti Kebangsaan Malaysia
- Doctoral advisor: Frank Rattay

Ille Christine Gebeshuber (born 10 April 1969 in Bruck an der Mur, Styria) is an Austrian physicist who is specialized in nanophysics and biomimetics.

== Biography ==
Ille Gebeshuber studied at the Vienna University of Technology, where she continued to work as a key researcher and lecturer. From 2009 until 2015 she was a professor at the Institute of Microengineering and Nanoelectronics (IMEN) at the National University of Malaysia (UKM). Since 2016 she is back at her home institution, the Vienna University of Technology, at the Institute of Applied Physics. Her book "Wo die Maschinen wachsen: Wie Lösungen aus dem Dschungel unser Leben verändern werden" (Where the machines grow: How solutions from the jungle will change our lives) was shortlisted as Austrian Science Book of the Year 2017.

2017 she was elected 'Austrian of the Year' in the category 'Research'.
