= Donislecel =

Cellular therapy medication

Clinical data
- Trade names: Lantidra
- Other names: donislecel-jujn
- License data: US DailyMed: Donislecel
- Routes of administration: Islet cell transplantation via intravenous infusion
- ATC code: A10XX02 (WHO)

Legal status
- Legal status: US: ℞-only

Identifiers
- KEGG: D12634

Donislecel, sold under the brand name Lantidra, is a cellular therapy medication used for the treatment of type 1 diabetes. Donislecel is an allogeneic (donor) pancreatic islet cellular therapy made from deceased donor pancreatic cells. Donislecel is administered as a single infusion into the hepatic (liver) portal vein.

The most common adverse reactions include nausea, fatigue, anemia, diarrhea, and abdominal pain.

Donislecel was approved for medical use in the United States in June 2023.

== Medical uses ==
Donislecel is indicated for the treatment of adults with type 1 diabetes who are unable to approach target glycated hemoglobin (average blood glucose levels) because of current repeated episodes of severe hypoglycemia (low blood sugar) despite intensive diabetes management and education.

The primary mechanism of action of donislecel is believed to be the secretion of insulin by the infused allogeneic islet beta cells. In some people with type 1 diabetes, these infused cells can produce enough insulin, so the recipient no longer needs to take insulin (by injections or pump) to control their blood sugar levels.

== Adverse effects ==
The most common adverse reactions include nausea, fatigue, anemia, diarrhea, and abdominal pain.

== History ==
The safety and effectiveness of donislecel was evaluated in two non-randomized, single-arm studies in which a total of 30 participants with type 1 diabetes and hypoglycemic unawareness received at least one infusion and a maximum of three infusions. Overall, 21 participants did not need to take insulin for a year or more, with eleven participants not needing insulin for one to five years and ten participants not needing insulin for more than five years. Five participants did not achieve any days of insulin independence.

The FDA granted marketing approval of Lantidra to CellTrans, Inc.
