= Teplizumab =

Monoclonal antibody

Monoclonal antibody
- Type: Whole antibody
- Source: Humanized (from mouse)
- Target: CD3

Clinical data
- Trade names: Tzield, others
- Other names: teplizumab-mzwv, PRV-031, MGA031
- AHFS/Drugs.com: Monograph
- MedlinePlus: a622077
- License data: US DailyMed: Teplizumab
- Routes of administration: Intravenous
- Drug class: Antidiabetic agent
- ATC code: A10XX01 (WHO)

Legal status
- Legal status: CA: ℞-only / Schedule D; US: ℞-only; EU: Rx-only

Identifiers
- CAS Number: 876387-05-2
- DrugBank: DB06606
- ChemSpider: none
- UNII: S4M959U2IJ
- KEGG: D09013

Chemical and physical data
- Formula: C_{6462}H_{9938}N_{1738}O_{2022}S_{46}
- Molar mass: 145801.49 g·mol^{−1}

Teplizumab, sold under the brand name Tzield among others, is an anti-CD3 humanized monoclonal antibody and the first approved treatment indicated to delay the onset of stage 3 type 1 diabetes in people living with stage 2 type 1 diabetes. Type 1 diabetes progresses from stage 1 (where a person has normal blood sugar but tests positive for two or more diabetes-related autoantibodies) to stage 2 (when blood sugar becomes abnormal, but they have no symptoms), to stage 3 (where significant beta cell loss has occurred and they typically have symptoms of type 1 diabetes); teplizumab delays the progression from stage 2 to stage 3.

Teplizumab's mechanism of action involves binding to CD3 protein complexes (a molecule involved in recognising antigens and activating T cells) on the surface of T-cells and modifying T-cell immune behaviour to reduce cytotoxicity. This appears to involve weak agonistic activity on signaling via the T cell receptor-CD3 complex associated with the development of anergy, unresponsiveness, and/or apoptosis, particularly of unwanted activated T effector cells. In addition, regulatory cytokines are released and regulatory T cells are expanded that may lead to the reestablishment of immune tolerance. To avoid overly stimulating cytokine release, the Fc region of this antibody has been engineered to have Fc receptor non-binding (FNB) properties.

Teplizumab was approved for medical use in the United States in November 2022, and in the European Union in January 2026. The US Food and Drug Administration (FDA) considers it to be a first-in-class medication.

== Medical uses ==
Teplizumab is indicated to delay the onset of stage 3 type 1 diabetes in persons over age 1 living with stage 2 type 1 diabetes. It also now has US FDA approval for persons aged 8 to 17 with recent diagnosis of stage 3 diabetes to slow the decline of c-peptide.

In June 2026, the US Food and Drug Administration expanded the indication for teplizumab to delay the decline of insulin production in people aged 8 years through 17 years of age who have been recently diagnosed with stage 3 type 1 diabetes.

== History ==
Teplizumab was developed at the University of Chicago in partnership with Ortho Pharmaceutical, and was then further developed at MacroGenics, Inc., including a collaboration with Eli Lilly to conduct the first phase III clinical trial in early-onset type 1 diabetes. After the initial Phase III trial conducted by Macrogenics failed to meet the primary endpoint, the drug was acquired by Provention Bio, which restarted development based on subset analysis of the original trials.

== Society and culture ==
=== Legal status ===
Teplizumab was approved for medical use in the United States in November 2022.

In November 2025, the Committee for Medicinal Products for Human Use of the European Medicines Agency adopted a positive opinion, recommending the granting of a marketing authorization for the medicinal product Teizeild, intended for the treatment of type 1 diabetes. The applicant for this medicinal product is Sanofi Winthrop Industrie. Teplizumab was authorized for medical use in the European Union in January 2026.

== Research ==
Teplizumab has been used in clinical trials with the aim of protecting the remaining β-cells in people newly diagnosed with type 1 diabetes. Immunomodulatory agents such as anti-CD3-antibodies may restore normal glucose control if provided in very early stages of the disease, such as stage 2 T1DM, when there are still enough beta cells to maintain euglycemia.

Teplizumab has been evaluated for treatment of renal allograft rejection, for induction therapy in islet transplant recipients, and for psoriatic arthritis.

A phase II study showed that teplizumab could delay the development of diabetes in family members of type 1 diabetics showing signs of progression towards diabetes by about two years after a single treatment, renewing interest in its use as a preventive rather than therapeutic treatment in high-risk patients.

A systematic review and meta-analysis, published in 2024, found that use of teplizumab is associated with better preservation of circulating C-peptide levels.
