= Bruck an der Mur =

- Municipality
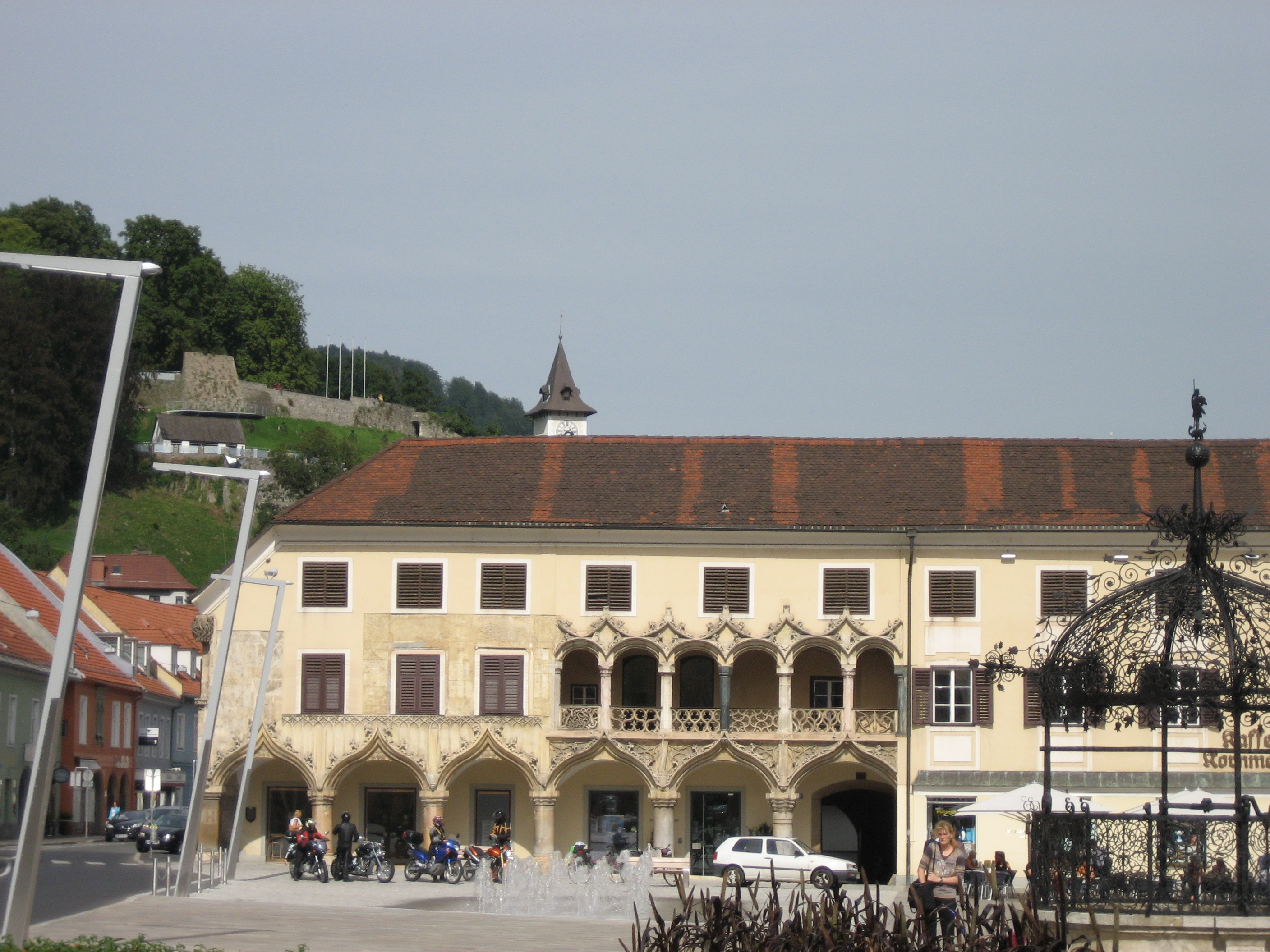
- Kornmesserhaus in Bruck an der Mur

- Coat of arms

- Location within Austria Location within Styria
- Coordinates: 47°25′00″N 15°16′00″E
- Country: Austria
- State: Styria
- District: Bruck-Mürzzuschlag

Government
  - Mayor: Andrea Winkelmaier (SPÖ)

Area
  - Total: 85.43 km^{2} (32.98 sq mi)
- Elevation: 468 m (1,535 ft)

Population (2018-01-01)
  - Total: 15,885
  - Density: 185.9/km^{2} (481.6/sq mi)
- Time zone: UTC+1 (CET)
  - Summer (DST): UTC+2 (CEST)
- Postal code: 8600
- Area code: 03862
- Vehicle registration: BM
- Website: www.bruckmur.at

Bruck an der Mur (Austrian German: [brʊk an dɐ ˈmuːɐ̯]) is a city of some 15,970 people located in the district Bruck-Mürzzuschlag, in the Austrian state of Styria. It is located at the confluence of the rivers Mur and Mürz. Its manufacturing includes metal products and paper. Bruck is located on the Graz to Vienna main line, and is an important regional rail junction.

== History ==
The earliest surviving record of Bruck dates from the time of King Ludovicus II "Germanicus", when it was identified, in a record dated 20 November 860, as "ad pruccam", a manor of the archbishopric of Salzburg. The settlement then identified with this name was in the location currently occupied by the suburb now called "St. Ruprecht". The settlement then located at what is now the centre of Bruck is identified in the ninth century record as "muorica kimundi" (i.e. the mouth of the Mürz).

The town was refounded in 1263 by King Otakar II of Bohemia, who was responsible for surrounding Bruck with its city walls. Bruck received its town privileges in 1277 from King Rudolph von Habsburg who in 1273 succeeded Otakar. Bruck an der Mur was an important medieval trade center specializing in iron work.

== Main sights ==
The Heiligen-Geist-Kapelle is a 15th-century Gothic chapel, which is of a unique design. The floor plan is an equilateral triangle in honor of the Trinity. This church was completely restored as much as possible to its original appearance, reopening in 2020.

In the centre, there is also the famous Kornmesser house, built in the Venetian style by Pankraz Kornmess in the 15th century. There is also the Iron Well with its lace-like dome.

The castle of Landskron burned down in the great fire of 1792. After that fire, just two of 166 houses were left standing.

The Grüner See (Green Lake) located in the neighboring municipality of Tragöß-Sankt Katharein is one of the main tourist attractions of the region.

== Sister cities ==
Bruck an der Mur is twinned with:

- Hagen-Hohenlimburg, Germany, (since 1974)
- Liévin, France, (since 1999)
- Veroli, Italy, (since 2005)
- Zalalövő, Hungary, (since 2015)
- Farra d'Isonzo, Italy, (since 2015)

== Climate ==
Climate data for Bruck an der Mur (1971–2000)
Month	Jan	Feb	Mar	Apr	May	Jun	Jul	Aug	Sep	Oct	Nov	Dec	Year
Record high °C (°F)	15.4 (59.7)	20.5 (68.9)	23.6 (74.5)	26.9 (80.4)	30.7 (87.3)	33.8 (92.8)	37.4 (99.3)	35.5 (95.9)	31.6 (88.9)	27.6 (81.7)	21.2 (70.2)	17.9 (64.2)	37.4 (99.3)
Mean daily maximum °C (°F)	2.4 (36.3)	5.7 (42.3)	10.3 (50.5)	14.4 (57.9)	19.7 (67.5)	22.7 (72.9)	24.8 (76.6)	24.7 (76.5)	20.4 (68.7)	14.7 (58.5)	7.3 (45.1)	2.8 (37.0)	14.2 (57.6)
Daily mean °C (°F)	−2.3 (27.9)	0.0 (32.0)	3.8 (38.8)	7.7 (45.9)	12.8 (55.0)	15.9 (60.6)	17.8 (64.0)	17.5 (63.5)	13.7 (56.7)	8.5 (47.3)	2.7 (36.9)	−1.2 (29.8)	8.1 (46.6)
Mean daily minimum °C (°F)	−5.5 (22.1)	−3.9 (25.0)	−0.7 (30.7)	2.6 (36.7)	7.3 (45.1)	10.7 (51.3)	12.4 (54.3)	12.5 (54.5)	9.1 (48.4)	4.6 (40.3)	−0.3 (31.5)	−3.8 (25.2)	3.8 (38.8)
Record low °C (°F)	−25.0 (−13.0)	−21.0 (−5.8)	−21.4 (−6.5)	−5.0 (23.0)	−3.0 (26.6)	0.6 (33.1)	4.5 (40.1)	2.7 (36.9)	−1.0 (30.2)	−8.5 (16.7)	−14.0 (6.8)	−19.5 (−3.1)	−25.0 (−13.0)
Average precipitation mm (inches)	32.6 (1.28)	32.3 (1.27)	49.7 (1.96)	50.1 (1.97)	82.9 (3.26)	106.1 (4.18)	110.5 (4.35)	101.0 (3.98)	78.1 (3.07)	60.1 (2.37)	49.2 (1.94)	42.6 (1.68)	795.2 (31.31)
Average snowfall cm (inches)	17.4 (6.9)	14.6 (5.7)	9.4 (3.7)	2.4 (0.9)	0.0 (0.0)	0.0 (0.0)	0.0 (0.0)	0.0 (0.0)	0.0 (0.0)	0.0 (0.0)	5.5 (2.2)	23.9 (9.4)	73.2 (28.8)
Average precipitation days (≥ 1.0 mm)	5.9	5.1	7.4	8.1	10.3	11.5	10.7	10.8	8.3	6.7	7.1	6.5	98.4
Average snowy days (≥ 1.0 cm)	19.7	11.8	4.3	0.7	0.1	0.0	0.0	0.0	0.0	0.0	3.8	12.3	52.7
Source: Central Institute for Meteorology and Geodynamics

== Notable people ==
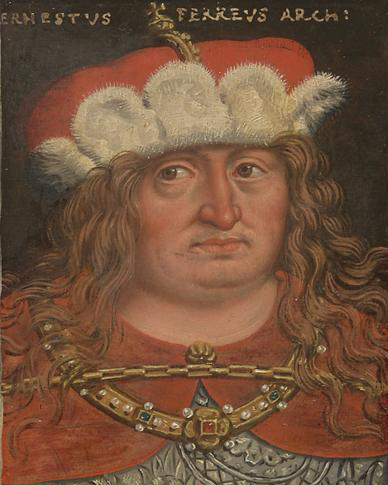
Portrait from ca. 1580 of Ernest the Iron

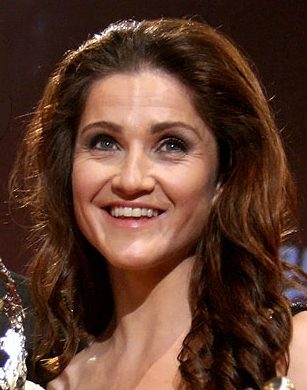
Elisabeth Görgl, 2012

- Ernest, Duke of Austria (1377–1424) member of the House of Habsburg, ruled over the Inner Austrian duchies of Styria, Carinthia and Carniola from 1406 until his death
- Rudolf Stöger-Steiner von Steinstätten (1861 – 1921) Colonel-General in the Austro-Hungarian army
- Richard Kretz (1865–1920) pathologist, particularly liver cirrhosis
- Menci Clement Crnčić (1865–1930) Croatian painter, printmaker, teacher and museum director
- Edmund Hlawka (1916–2009) mathematician and number theorist
- Hanns Malissa (1920–2010) analytical chemist and environmental chemist
- Christian Anders (born 1945) singer, musician, composer, author and conspiracy theorist.
- Eva Rueber-Staier (born 1951) actress, TV Host, model, beauty queen, won Miss World 1969
- Erwin Wurm (born 1954) artist, currently lives and works in Vienna and Limberg
- Santacitta Bhikkhuni (born 1958), Buddhist nun & teacher, cultural anthropologist, artist, currently lives at the Aloka Earth Room near San Francisco, CA
- Werner S. Weiglhofer (1962–2003), professor of mathematics at the University of Glasgow
- Ille Gebeshuber (born 1969) physicist, specializes in nanophysics and biomimetics

=== Sport ===
- Andreas Meklau (born 1967), an Austrian motorbike racer, mainly in Superbike.
- Elisabeth Görgl (born 1981) retired World Cup alpine ski racer, twice bronze medallist at the 2010 Winter Olympics
- Robert Almer (born 1984), an Austrian former football goalkeeper, has played over 120 games and 33 for Austria
- Philipp Hütter (born 1990), an Austrian footballer who has played over 290 games
- Matthias Maak (born 1992), an Austrian footballer who has played over 320 games
- Sven Sprangler (born 1995), an Austrian footballer who has played over 330 games
- Sebastian Ofner (born 1996), an Austrian tennis player, currently the No. 1 Austrian player.
