= PTPRN =

Protein-coding gene in the species Homo sapiens

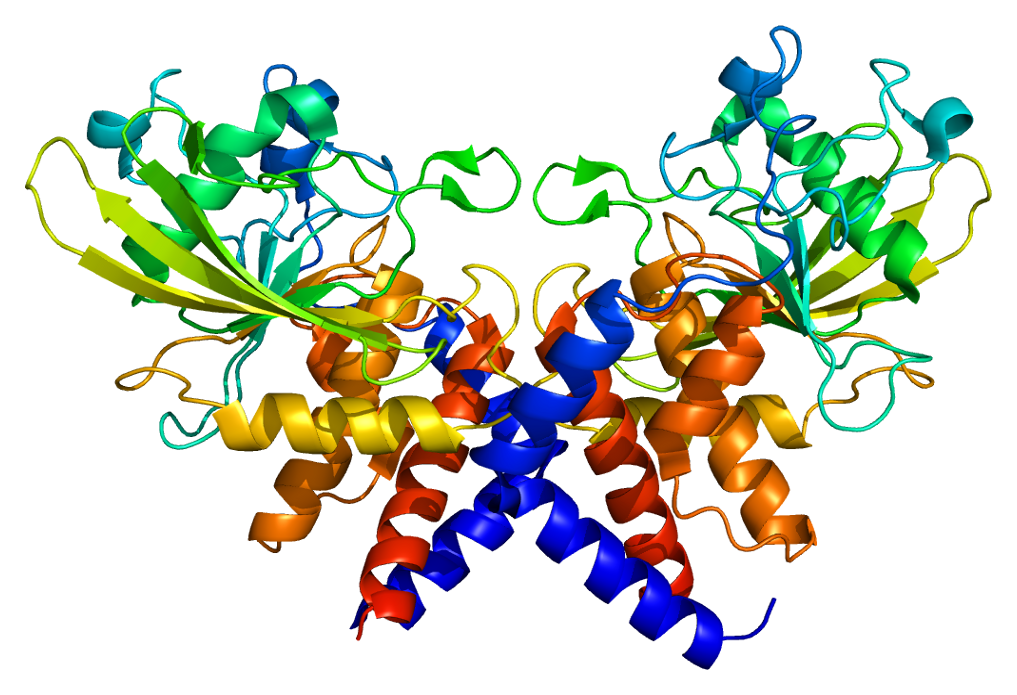

Identifiers
- Aliases: PTPRN, IA-2, IA-2/PTP, IA2, ICA512, R-PTP-N, protein tyrosine phosphatase, receptor type N, protein tyrosine phosphatase receptor type N
- External IDs: OMIM: 601773; MGI: 102765; GeneCards: PTPRN
Available structures
PDB	Ortholog search: PDBe RCSB
PDB	List of PDB id codes 2I1Y, 2QT7, 3N01, 3N4W, 3NG8, 3NP5

Gene location (Human)
Chr.	Chromosome 2 (human)
Band	2q35	Start	219,289,623 bp
Band	2q35	End	219,309,648 bp

Gene location (Mouse)
Chr.	Chromosome 1 (mouse)
Band	1 C4|1 38.64 cM	Start	75,223,671 bp
Band	1 C4|1 38.64 cM	End	75,241,146 bp
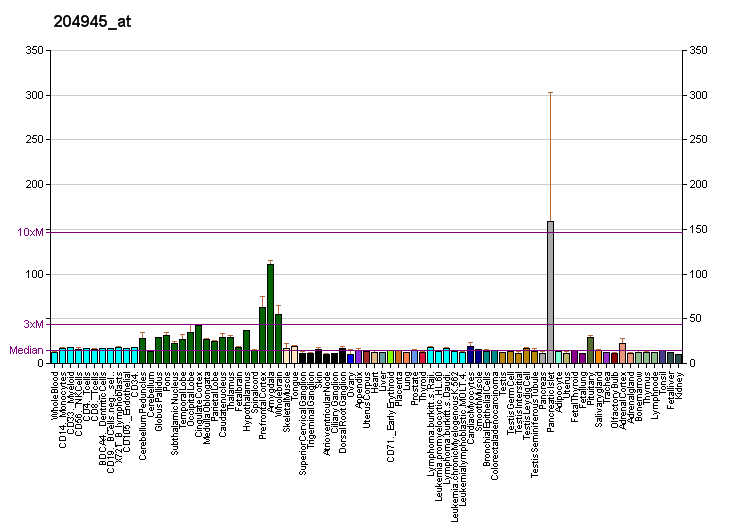
RNA expression pattern
Bgee	Human / Mouse (ortholog); Top expressed in: islet of Langerhans; Brodmann area 10; right frontal lobe; right hemisphere of cerebellum; pituitary gland; anterior cingulate cortex; anterior pituitary; frontal pole; nucleus accumbens; Brodmann area 9 / Top expressed in: superior frontal gyrus; primary visual cortex; entorhinal cortex; perirhinal cortex; dentate gyrus of hippocampal formation granule cell; CA3 field; dorsomedial hypothalamic nucleus; nucleus of stria terminalis; central gray substance of midbrain; supraoptic nucleus; More reference expression data
BioGPS	More reference expression data
Gene ontology
Molecular function	spectrin binding; protein binding; protein tyrosine phosphatase activity; transcription factor binding; ubiquitin-like protein ligase binding; GTPase binding; phosphatase activity; hydrolase activity
Cellular component	axon terminus; integral component of membrane; perikaryon; endosome; Golgi apparatus; cell projection; membrane; synaptic vesicle; plasma membrane; transport vesicle membrane; synapse; secretory granule; axon; cell junction; soma; cytoplasmic vesicle; nucleus
Biological process	luteinization; cytokine-mediated signaling pathway; response to reactive oxygen species; insulin secretion; response to glucose; response to estrogen; response to insulin; response to cAMP; dense core granule maturation; insulin secretion involved in cellular response to glucose stimulus; transcription, DNA-templated; regulation of transcription, DNA-templated; positive regulation of transcription by RNA polymerase II; positive regulation of type B pancreatic cell proliferation; peptidyl-tyrosine dephosphorylation; protein dephosphorylation; dephosphorylation
Sources:Amigo / QuickGO
Orthologs
Databases	NCBI: entry; OMA: entry
Species	Human	Mouse
Entrez	5798	19275
Ensembl	ENSG00000054356	ENSMUSG00000026204
UniProt	Q16849	Q60673
RefSeq (mRNA)	NM_001199763; NM_001199764; NM_002846	NM_008985; NM_001359281
RefSeq (protein)	NP_001186692; NP_001186693; NP_002837	n/a
Location (UCSC)	Chr 2: 219.29 – 219.31 Mb	Chr 1: 75.22 – 75.24 Mb
PubMed search
- Wikidata
View/Edit Human	View/Edit Mouse

Receptor-type tyrosine-protein phosphatase-like N, also called "IA-2", is an enzyme that in humans is encoded by the PTPRN gene.

== Overview ==
The IA-2 protein encoded by PTPRN gene is a member of the protein tyrosine phosphatase (PTP) family and PTPRN subfamily. PTPs are known to be signaling molecules that regulate a variety of cellular processes including cell growth, differentiation, mitotic cycle, and oncogenic transformation. This PTP possesses an extracellular region, a single transmembrane region, and a single catalytic domain, and thus represents a receptor-type PTP. This PTP was found to be an autoantigen that is reactive with insulin-dependent diabetes mellitus (IDDM) patient sera, and thus may be a potential target of autoimmunity in diabetes mellitus.

=== Structure ===
IA-2 and IA-2b belong to family of protein tyrosine phosphatase-like (PTP) molecules. IA-2 is a transmembrane protein with 979 amino acids encoded by a gene on human chromosome 2q35. Similarly, IA-2b has 986 amino acids, and it is located on human chromosome 7q36. The IA-2 is synthesised as a pro-protein of 110 kDa which is then converted by post-translational modifications into a 130 kDa protein.

The IA-2 and IA-2b shares 74% identity within the intracellular domains, but only 27% in the extracellular domains.

The IA-2 protein is expressed mainly in cells of neuroendocrine origin, such as pancreatic islets and brain. The IA-2 protein is localised in the membrane of secretory granules of pancreatic β-cells.

=== Function ===
Even though the IA-2/b has a similar structure to other PTPs, there is a critical amino acid replacement at position 911 (Asp for Ala), which is required for enzymatic activity. These proteins thus fail to show enzymatic activity and their function remains unclear. They could play role in insulin secretory pathways, sorting out proteins or regulates other PTPs.

=== Autoantigen in Type 1 Diabetes ===
The IA-2 is a second major autoantigen in Type 1 Diabetes. IA-2 autoantibodies are found in 78% type 1 diabetics at the time of diagnosis. It has been shown that the autoantibodies exclusively react with the intracellular domain, also called juxtamembrane, but not with the extracellular domain of IA-2/b.

It is suggested that IA-2 and not the IA-2b is the primary PTP-like autoantigen in Type 1 Diabetes. The juxtamembrane region in IA-2 is probably the early antibody target. Followed by multiple epitope spreading which is believed to take place in the early development of the disease.

=== Autoantibodies in Type 1 Diabetes ===
Autoantibodies targeting pancreatic islet cell can occur years before a hyperglycaemia is established, therefore these autoantibodies are used in prediction of Type 1 Diabetes.

Islet cell autoantibodies are detected in serum, including ICA (islet cell cytoplasma autoantibodies), IAA (autoantibodies to insulin), GAD (glutamic acid decarboxylase), IA-2 (insulinoma-associated protein 2), and ZnT8 (zinc transporter of islet beta cells).

However, it is not clear if a primary autoantigen exists and immune reaction against other molecules results from secondary antigen spreading, or multiple molecules represent a primary target.

The first autoimmune targets are usually aimed against insulin or GAD, and it is unique to observe IA-2 or ZnT8 as the first autoantibodies. What set off the appearance of a first β-cell targeting autoantibody is unclear.

The IAA antibody usually appears early in life, median age is 1.49. Presence of GAD as the first autoantibody is more widespread with median age 4.04. It is relatively rare to see IA-2 as the primary autoantibody, median age 3.03. Interestingly, secondary autoantibodies follow different patterns to mask the primary autoantibodies, if both are combined. If the primary autoantibody is IAA then GAD briskly appears with peak of 2 years age. Secondary IAA usually occurs after GAD, where the age distribution is over wide range.

It is unknown whether the appearance of autoantibodies corresponds with insulitis process in the pancreas and if so, what is the combination of the autoantibodies.

== Interactions ==
PTPRN has been shown to interact with SPTBN4.
