= Willy Gepts =

Willy Gepts (March 11, 1922 – January 31, 1991) was a Belgian pathologist and diabetes researcher. He worked from 1965 as a professor of pathology at the Université libre de Bruxelles and later at the newly founded Dutch-speaking Vrije Universiteit Brussel. With his research on the pathological anatomy of the islets of Langerhans in the pancreas, he made important contributions to the medical knowledge about type 1 diabetes, a type of diabetes mellitus that is an autoimmune disease.

== Life ==
W. Gepts was born in Antwerp and graduated in medicine at the Université libre de Bruxelles (ULB), from which he graduated in 1946. He specialized in pathology and devoted himself (next to his clinical work) to the study of morphology. His focus lay on the pancreas islets in various diseases, both in patients and in animals. He developed a microscopic observations method to quantify the number of islets of Langerhans. He succeeded in determining the various forms of diabetes mellitus. His research demonstrated that type 1 diabetes is characterized by a marked decrease in the number of islands. On the basis of these results, he made his 1957 dissertation.

At the newly founded Dutch-language section of the Université libre de Bruxelles 1965 he was appointed Professor of Pathology. Four years later, he became head of the Department of Pathology of the Brugmann University Hospital in Brussels. Along with other professors of the ULB he campaigned for the establishment of an independent Dutch-speaking university in Brussels. This happened eventually, and in 1970 the Vrije Universiteit Brussel was established. Between 1970 and 1980 he taught there and continued his research on pathological anatomy of the pancreas. In addition, he was Vice-Rector of the University from 1974 to 1979. He was committed to the development of the newly created School of Medicine.

W. Gepts was married and the father of four children. He died in 1991 in his hometown.
