= SPTBN4 =

Protein-coding gene in the species Homo sapiens

Identifiers
- Aliases: SPTBN4, QV, SPNB4, SPTBN3, spectrin beta, non-erythrocytic 4, CMND, NEDHND
- External IDs: OMIM: 606214; MGI: 1890574; GeneCards: SPTBN4

Gene location (Human)
Chr.	Chromosome 19 (human)
Band	19q13.2	Start	40,466,241 bp
Band	19q13.2	End	40,576,464 bp

Gene location (Mouse)
Chr.	Chromosome 7 (mouse)
Band	7 A3|7 15.88 cM	Start	27,055,808 bp
Band	7 A3|7 15.88 cM	End	27,147,111 bp
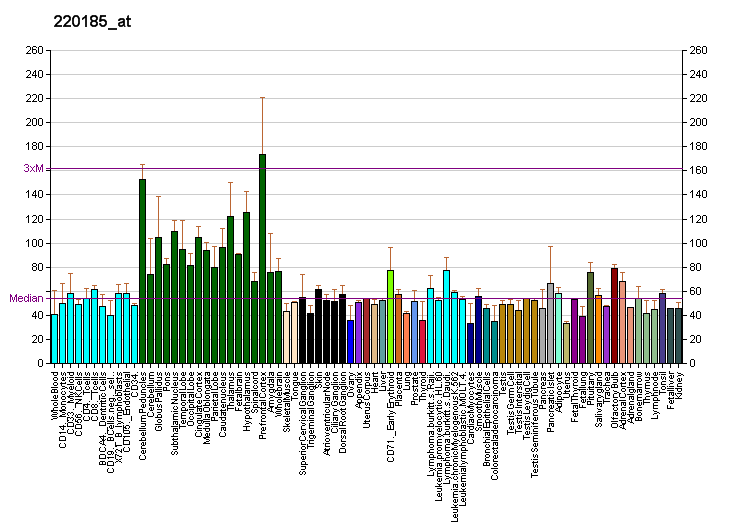
RNA expression pattern
Bgee	Human / Mouse (ortholog); Top expressed in: right hemisphere of cerebellum; right frontal lobe; Brodmann area 9; anterior cingulate cortex; prefrontal cortex; nucleus accumbens; caudate nucleus; putamen; amygdala; pituitary gland / Top expressed in: superior frontal gyrus; primary visual cortex; cerebellar cortex; nucleus of stria terminalis; central gray substance of midbrain; dentate gyrus of hippocampal formation granule cell; subiculum; piriform cortex; nucleus accumbens; cerebellar vermis; More reference expression data
BioGPS	More reference expression data
Gene ontology
Molecular function	phosphatase binding; spectrin binding; structural constituent of cytoskeleton; protein binding; ankyrin binding; actin binding; phospholipid binding
Cellular component	cytoplasm; cytosol; PML body; spectrin; membrane; cell body fiber; nuclear matrix; adherens junction; plasma membrane; node of Ranvier; axon; soma; cell cortex; axon hillock; axon initial segment; paranode region of axon; extracellular exosome; cytoskeleton; intercalated disc
Biological process	clustering of voltage-gated sodium channels; axonogenesis; regulation of sodium ion transport; transmission of nerve impulse; hearing; negative regulation of heart rate; MAPK cascade; axon guidance; endoplasmic reticulum to Golgi vesicle-mediated transport; reproductive process; adult behavior; cardiac conduction; regulation of peptidyl-serine phosphorylation; actin filament capping; positive regulation of multicellular organism growth; fertilization; central nervous system projection neuron axonogenesis; vesicle-mediated transport; adult walking behavior; protein localization to plasma membrane; regulation of molecular function; cytoskeleton organization
Sources:Amigo / QuickGO
Orthologs
Databases	NCBI: entry; OMA: entry
Species	Human	Mouse
Entrez	57731	80297
Ensembl	ENSG00000160460	ENSMUSG00000011751
UniProt	Q9H254	n/a
RefSeq (mRNA)	NM_020971; NM_025213	NM_001199234; NM_001199235; NM_001199236; NM_032610
RefSeq (protein)	NP_066022; NP_079489	n/a
Location (UCSC)	Chr 19: 40.47 – 40.58 Mb	Chr 7: 27.06 – 27.15 Mb
PubMed search
- Wikidata
View/Edit Human	View/Edit Mouse

Spectrin, beta, non-erythrocytic 4, also known as SPTBN4, is a protein that in humans is encoded by the SPTBN4 gene.

Spectrin is an actin crosslinking and molecular scaffold protein that links the cell membrane to the actin cytoskeleton, and functions in the determination of cell shape, arrangement of transmembrane proteins, and organization of organelles. It is composed of two antiparallel dimers of alpha- and beta- subunits. This gene is one member of a family of beta-spectrin genes. The encoded protein localizes to the nuclear matrix, PML nuclear bodies, and cytoplasmic vesicles. A highly similar gene in mice is required for localization of specific membrane proteins in polarized regions of neurons. Multiple transcript variants encoding different isoforms have been found for this gene.

== Interactions ==
SPTBN4 has been shown to interact with PTPRN and DISC1.
