= Islet cell transplantation =

Transference of pancreatic islets

- Microscopic image of an islet of Langerhans (lighter area) surrounded by exocrine pancreas tissue (darker staining).
- MeSH: D016381

Islet transplantation is the transplantation of isolated islets from a donor pancreas into another person. It is a treatment for type 1 diabetes. Once transplanted, the islets begin to produce insulin, actively regulating the level of glucose in the blood.

Islets are usually infused into the person's liver. If the cells are not from a genetically identical donor the person's body will recognize them as foreign and the immune system will begin to attack them as with any transplant rejection. To prevent this immunosuppressant drugs are used. A study from 2005 showed that islet transplantation has progressed to the point that 58% of the people were insulin independent one year after the operation. A review published 2016 reported a 50 – 70% rate of insulin independence after five years, in five studies from leading transplant centers published 2005 – 2012.

In the period from 1999 to 2004, 471 people with type 1 diabetes received islet transplants at 43 institutions worldwide.

Donislecel (Lantidra) allogeneic (donor) pancreatic islet cellular therapy was approved for medical use in the United States in June 2023.

== History ==
The concept of islet transplantation is not new. Investigators as early as the English surgeon Charles Pybus (1882–1975) attempted to graft pancreatic tissue to cure diabetes.

== Goals ==
The goal of islet transplantation is to infuse enough islets to control the blood glucose level removing the need for insulin injections. For an average-size person (70 kg), a typical transplant requires about one million islets, isolated from two donor pancreases. Because good control of blood glucose can slow or prevent the progression of complications associated with diabetes, such as nerve or eye damage, a successful transplant may reduce the risk of these complications. But a transplant recipient will need to take immunosuppressive drugs that stop the immune system from rejecting the transplanted islets.

Newer studies have focused their attention towards reducing severe hypoglycemic events, a life-threatening state in type 1 diabetes, rather than focus on removing the need for insulin injections entirely.

== Procedure ==
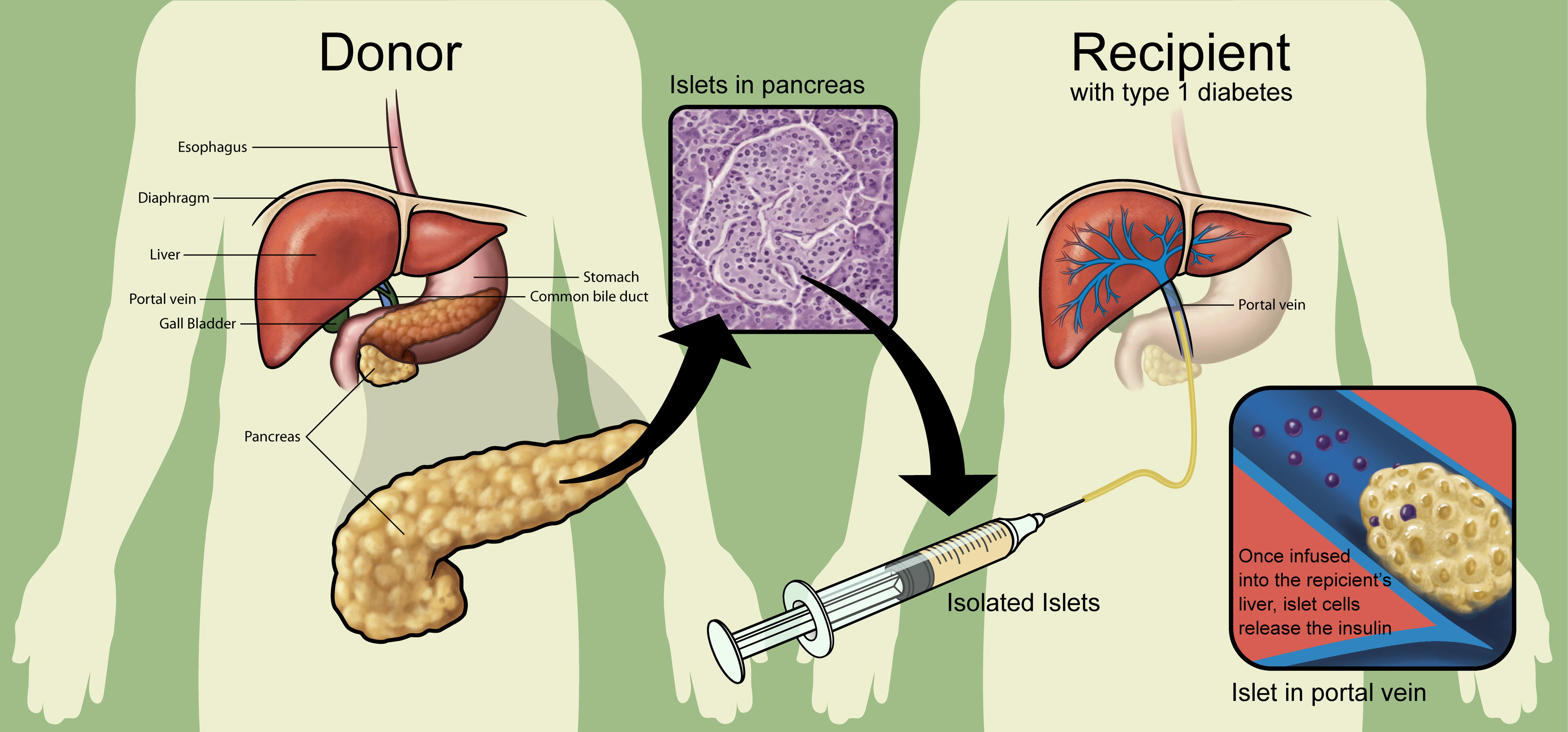
The process of islet transplantation (illustration by Giovanni Maki).

Researchers use a mixture of highly purified enzymes (Collagenase) to isolate islets from the pancreas of a deceased donor. Collagenase solution is injected into the pancreatic duct which runs through the head, body and tail of the pancreas. Delivered this way, the enzyme solution causes distension of the pancreas, which is subsequently cut into small chunks and transferred into so-called Ricordi's chamber, where digestion takes place until the islets are liberated and removed from the solution. Isolated islets are then separated from the exocrine tissue and debris in a process called purification.

During the transplant, a radiologist uses ultrasound and radiography to guide placement of a catheter through the upper abdomen and into the portal vein of the liver. The islets are then infused through the catheter into the liver. The person will receive a local anesthetic. If a person cannot tolerate local anesthesia, the surgeon may use general anesthesia and do the transplant through a small incision. Possible risks of the procedure include bleeding or blood clots.

It takes time for the islets to attach to new blood vessels and begin releasing insulin. The doctor will order many tests to check blood glucose levels after the transplant, and insulin may be needed until control is achieved.

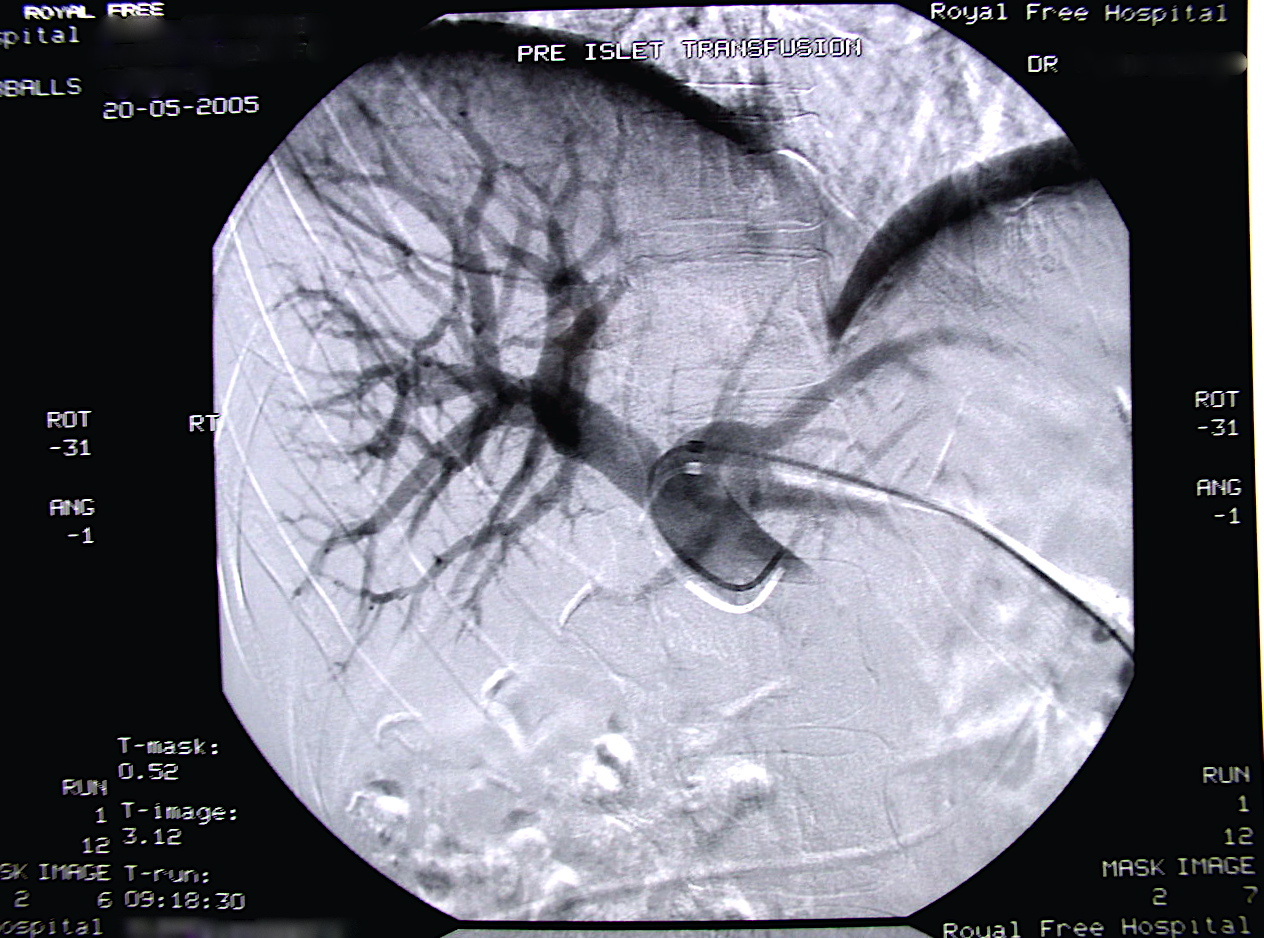
Radiographic image of the portal vein and its branches in the transplant recipient before infusion of isolated islets.

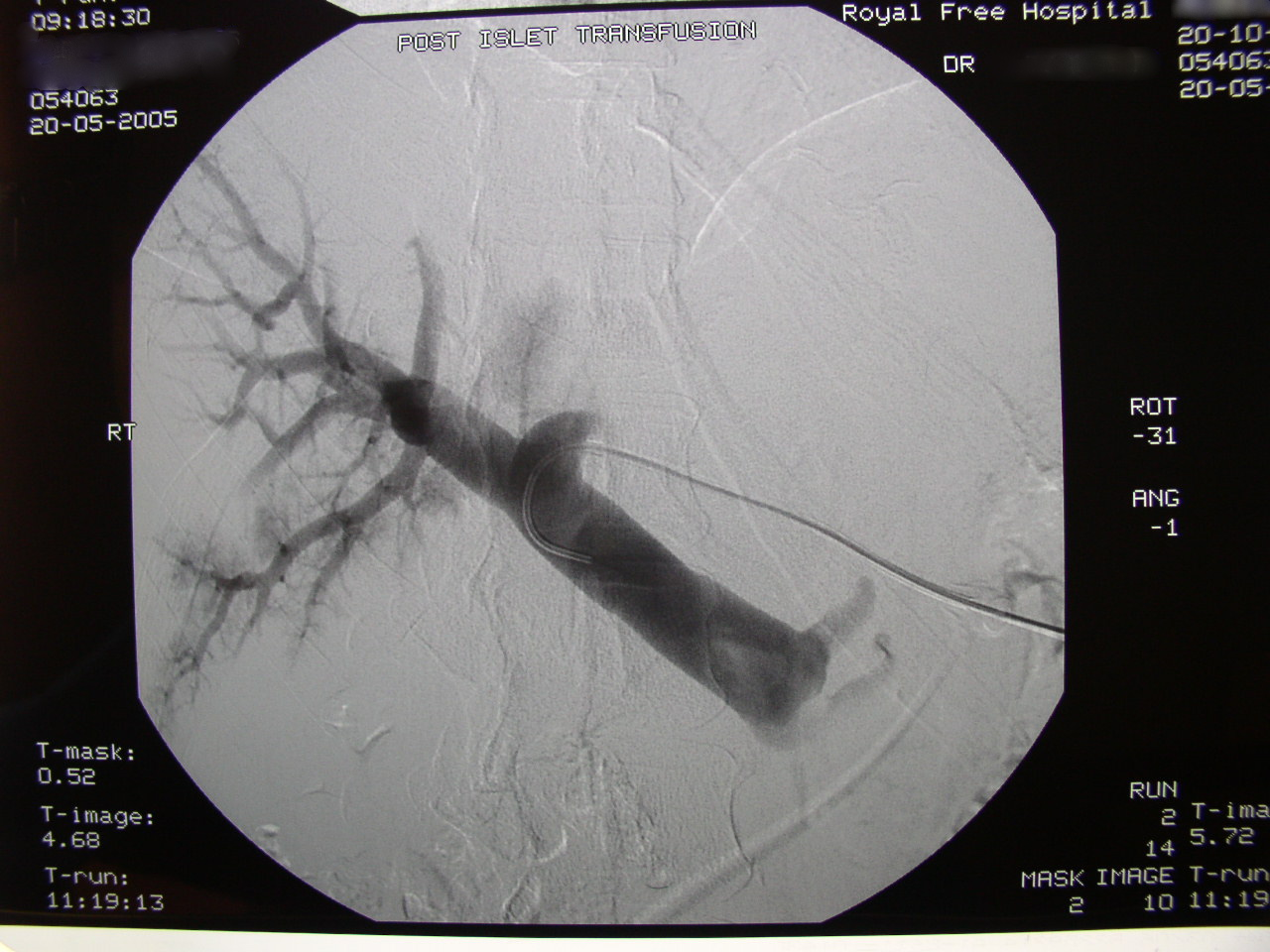
Post-transplant radiographic image of the recipient's portal tree.

== Immunosuppression ==
The Edmonton protocol uses a combination of immunosuppressive drugs, including daclizumab (Zenapax), sirolimus (Rapamune) and tacrolimus (Prograf). Daclizumab is given intravenously right after the transplant and then discontinued. Sirolimus and tacrolimus, the two main drugs that keep the immune system from destroying the transplanted islets, must be taken for life.

== Limitations ==
While significant progress has been made in the islet transplantation field, many obstacles remain that currently preclude its widespread application. Two of the most important limitations are the currently inadequate means for preventing islet rejection, and the limited supply of islets for transplantation. Current immunosuppressive regimens are capable of preventing islet failure for months to years, but the agents used in these treatments are expensive and may increase the risk for specific malignancies and opportunistic infections. In addition, and somewhat ironically, the most commonly used agents (like calcineurin inhibitors and rapamycin) are also known to impair normal islet function and/or insulin action. Further, like all medications, the agents have other associated toxicities, with side effects such as oral ulcers, peripheral edema, anemia, weight loss, hypertension, hyperlipidemia, diarrhea and fatigue. Perhaps of greatest concern to the person and physician is the harmful effect of certain widely employed immunosuppressive agents on renal function. For the person with diabetes, renal function is a crucial factor in determining long-term outcome, and calcineurin inhibitors (tacrolimus and ciclosporin) are significantly nephrotoxic. Thus, while some people with a pancreas transplant tolerate the immunosuppressive agents well, and for such people diabetic nephropathy can gradually improve, in other people the net effect (decreased risk due to the improved blood glucose control, increased risk from the immunosuppressive agents) may worsen kidney function. Indeed, Ojo et al. have published an analysis indicating that among people receiving other-than-kidney allografts, 7%–21% end up with kidney failure as a result of the transplant and/or subsequent immunosuppression. Hypoxia is another key challenge in islet transplantation, particularly in the use of stem cell-derived islet, which can cause β-cell dysfunction.

Another limitation to the islet transplantation process is the inflammatory response of the liver. Dr. Melena Bellin is an associate professor of pediatric endocrinology and surgery and director of research for the islet autotransplant program at the University of Minnesota Medical Center and Masonic Children's Hospital. Her research centers on making islet transplants safer and more effective for type one diabetics. The process of infusing islet cells into the liver can trigger an inflammatory response in the body. This reaction leads to a large amount of the newly transplanted islets being destroyed. Losing islet cells decreases the probability of successful insulin production and increases the likelihood of type one diabetes developing again in the patient. Dr. Bellin is currently testing two anti-inflammatory drugs that are already on the market to see if they may be useful in preventing inflammation that destroys islet cells.
