= Richard Kretz =

Austrian pathologist

Richard Kretz (12 May 1865 – 13 May 1920) was an Austrian pathologist born in Bruck an der Mur, Styria. He is remembered for pathological research involving regenerative and degenerative processes that take place in liver cirrhosis.

Kretz earned his medical doctorate at the University of Vienna, and following graduation worked as assistant to Hans Kundrat (1845-1893) at the clinic for pathological anatomy in Vienna. In 1887 he received his habilitation, and in 1893 relocated to Prague, where he succeeded Hans Chiari (1851-1916) as professor of pathology. From 1910 to 1913 he was professor of pathology at the University of Würzburg.

== Written works ==
- Ein Fall von Syringomyelie (1890) – A case of syringomyelia.
- Uber einen Fall von Tuberculose des weiblichen Genitalcanales, combinirt mit Aträsie der Vagina (1891) – Involving a case of tuberculosis of the female genital canals, combined with vaginal atresia.
- Circumscripte Keratose im Larynx (1891) – Circumscribed keratosis in the larynx.
- Über Hypertrophie und Regeneration des Lebergewebes, Wiener klin. Wochenschr. 1894, S. 365. - On hypertrophy and regeneration of liver tissue.
- Hämosiderin-Pigmentirung der Leber und Lebercirrhose, 1896 – Hemosiderin-pigmentation involving the liver and liver cirrhosis.
- Ueber Lebercirrhose, 1899 – On liver cirrhosis.
