= Martin Benno Schmidt =

German pathologist (1863–1949)

Martin Benno Schmidt (23 August 1863 – 27 November 1949) was a German pathologist born in Leipzig.

He spent several years as an assistant at the University of Strasbourg, where he worked under Friedrich Daniel von Recklinghausen (1833-1910). In 1906 he became a professor of pathology at the medical academy in Düsseldorf, and afterwards worked as a pathologist in Zurich and Marburg. In 1913 he succeeded Richard Kretz (1865-1920) as professor of pathology at the University of Würzburg, a position he maintained until his retirement in 1934.

Schmidt specialized in pathological investigations of bone disorders such as rickets, osteogenesis imperfecta, and osteomalacia. He is remembered for his description of autoimmune polyendocrine syndrome, type II, a disease characterized by autoimmune activity against more than one endocrine gland. This condition is sometimes referred to as "Schmidt's syndrome". He also performed important studies involving iron metabolism.

== Published works ==
With pathologist Ludwig Aschoff (1866-1942), he published a treatise on pyelonephritis called Die Pyelonephritis in anatomischer und bakteriologischer Beziehung. Other noted works by Schmidt include:

- Die Verbreitungswege der Karzinome und die Beziehung generalisierter Sarkome zu den leukämischen Neubildungen, Jena 1903 - Schmidt supported the theory of the hematogenous origin of carcinoma metastases.
- Ueber Typhus abdominalis, 1907 – About abdominal typhus.
- Die anatomischen Grundlagen der Immunität und Disposition bei Infektionskrankheiten, 1908 – The anatomical basis of immunity and disposition for infectious diseases.
- Der einfluss Eisenarmer und eisenreicher Nahrung auf Blut und Körper, 1928 – The influence of iron-low and iron-rich food for blood and body.
