= Frederick Charles Pybus =

Frederick Charles Pybus DCL, FRCS (2 November 1883 – 10 March 1975) was an English surgeon from Newcastle-on-Tyne, who contributed to research into organ transplantation.

== Research ==
In July 1916, Pybus reported an attempt at allogenic transplantation of pancreatic tissue. Despite a mild reduction in glucose excretion in one of two diabetic patients transplanted with fragments of human cadaveric pancreatic tissue., both patients subsequently died.

Pybus concluded that:

...although transplants represented the most rational form of therapy, they would continue to fail as long as science did not understand the principles involved.

He presented his collection of books on the history of medicine to the library of the University of Newcastle upon Tyne.
