= Ketosis-prone diabetes =

- Other names: KPD
- Specialty: Endocrinology

Ketosis-prone diabetes (KPD) is an intermediate form of diabetes that has some characteristics of type 1 and some of type 2 diabetes. Type 1 diabetes involves autoimmune destruction of pancreatic beta cells which create insulin. This occurs earlier in a person's life, leading to patients being insulin dependent, and the lack of natural insulin makes patients prone to a condition called diabetic ketoacidosis (DKA). Type 2 diabetes is different in that it is usually caused by insulin resistance in the body in older patients leading to beta cell burnout over time, and is not prone to DKA. KPD is a condition that involves DKA like type 1, but occurs later in life and can regain beta cell function like type 2 diabetes. However, it is distinct from latent autoimmune diabetes of adults (LADA), a form of type 1 sometimes referred to as type 1.5 that does not occur with DKA. There are also distinctions to be made between KPD and LADA as patients who exhibit KPD symptoms can regain beta cell function similar to type 2 diabetics whereas LADA will not exhibit this reclamation of beta cell function.

KPD is readily diagnosable because it presents a single characteristic, ketoacidosis, which confirms it as ketosis-prone diabetes. KPD comes in four forms depending upon the presence or absence of β-cell autoantibodies (A+ or A−) and β-cell functional reserve (β+ or β−). Other styles of classification have been used for KPD, including styles incorporating BMI, but the Aβ system has been found to have the highest accuracy and predictive value of all the systems utilized. The autoantibodies used to diagnose the A+ subtypes of KPD include the autoantibodies detected in patients with type 1 diabetes, including Glutamic Acid Decarboxylase 65 (GAD65), Zinc Transporter T8 (ZnT8), Islet Antigen-2 (IA-2), and HLA class II type 1 diabetes susceptibility alleles.

== Management ==
The management of KPD revolves around 3 main components: acutely managing DKA, identification of KPD subtype, and longterm diabetic management similar to that in type 2 diabetes. As patients are likely to initially present in DKA, the acute management of DKA is the first priority. The treatment of DKA in KPD is identical to the treatment of DKA caused by type 1 diabetes and revolves around fluid repletion, electrolyte repletion, and administration of insulin. After the resolution of the DKA episode consideration of what patients to test for KPD should be considered. Most providers would recommend testing for autoantibodies in any patient presenting with a DKA episode, and this thought process should be followed especially in patients who do not fit a classic type 1 diabetes picture of a young patient with classical diabetic symptoms. In order to get a full Aβ diagnosis presence of beta cell function must also be completed using C-peptide levels. After diagnosing the subtype of KPD, long term management with a primary care provider should be done with diabetic education and counseling as patients will require insulin therapy after initial presentation. Routine followups serve an important role during this time to evaluate the changing insulin needs of the patient. Due to the propensity for DKA, insulin is a staple of KPD management, and other anti-glycemic agents should only be added if glucose levels rise while on effective insulin therapy.

== Prognosis ==
The prognosis of KPD combines aspects of both Type 1 and Type 2 diabetes. While the presentation mimics type 1 diabetes with its propensity for DKA, patients with KPD can regain pancreatic beta cell function over time. Specifically patients who have beta cell reserve at the onset of the disease (the β+ subtype) have around a 50% chance to regain full beta cell function and become insulin independent. These cases do make a minority of KPD patients however, and insulin dependence is an expected outcome for most patients. In these cases insulin dependence will reflect that of type 2 diabetes with increased insulin dependence reflecting lifestyle choices and diabetic management. Education for these patients should reflect the education for patients presenting with regular type 2 diabetes.

The presence of beta cell function restoration seems to come down to how much beta cell reserve the patient has at onset but also the presence of autoantibodies. Patients with autoantibodies at presentation have a lower likelihood of having beta cell function restored, a fact that holds true even when the type of KPD is not distinguished by the traditional Aβ subtype system. Lifestyle changes that worsen regular type 2 diabetes are still associated with insulin dependence, such as patients who do not make effective diet and lifestyle changes.

An important factor for beta cell functionality is proper glycemic control, a factor it shares with type 2 diabetes. Patients who maintain proper glycemic control to protect their functioning beta cells exhibited lesser disease courses and regained beta cell functionality at a much higher rate than patients who had looser or less stringent glucose control.
