= Outline of diabetes =

Overview of and topical guide to diabetes

The following outline is provided as an overview of and topical guide to diabetes mellitus (diabetes insipidus not included below):

Diabetes mellitus – group of metabolic diseases in which a person has high blood sugar, either because the pancreas does not produce enough insulin, or because cells do not respond properly to the insulin that is produced, a condition called insulin resistance. The resultant high blood sugar produces the classical symptoms of polyuria (frequent urination), polydipsia (increased thirst) and polyphagia (increased hunger).

== What is diabetes mellitus? ==
Diabetes can be described as:

- A class of metabolic diseases
  - A class of systemic diseases

== Types of diabetes mellitus ==
- Prediabetes –
- Main types of diabetes:
  - Type 1 diabetes – disease that results in autoimmune destruction of insulin-producing beta cells of the pancreas.
  - Type 2 diabetes – metabolic disorder that is characterized by high blood glucose in the context of insulin resistance and relative insulin deficiency.
    - Disease of affluence – type 2 diabetes is one of the "diseases of affluence", which include mostly chronic non-communicable diseases for which personal lifestyles and societal conditions associated with economic development are believed to be important risk factors.
  - Gestational diabetes – Gestational diabetes, is a temporary condition that is first diagnosed during pregnancy. Like type 1 and type 2 diabetes, gestational diabetes causes blood sugar levels to become too high. It involves an increased risk of developing diabetes for both mother and child. During pregnancy, the body becomes resistant to insulin, so that more glucose feeds the fetus. Unlike other types of diabetes, gestational diabetes is not a permanent disease, but disappears on its own with the birth of the child. However, this condition that appeared during the 9 months of pregnancy predisposes the woman to long-term diabetes.
- Other types of diabetes:
  - Congenital diabetes –
  - Cystic fibrosis-related diabetes –
  - Steroid diabetes –
  - Monogenic diabetes –

== Signs and symptoms of diabetes mellitus ==
- Symptoms of prediabetes – prediabetes typically has no distinct signs or symptoms. Patients should monitor for signs and symptoms of type 2 diabetes mellitus (see below).

=== Signs and symptoms of Type II diabetes mellitus ===
Symptoms of type II diabetes mellitus include:

- Constant hunger
- Unexplained weight loss
- Weight gain
- Flu-like symptoms, including weakness and fatigue
- Blurred vision
- Slow healing of cuts or bruises
- Tingling or loss of feeling in hands or feet
- Recurring gum or skin infections
- Recurring vaginal or bladder infections
- Acetone odor during diabetic ketoacidosis (DKA)

== Causes of diabetes ==
=== Causes of diabetes mellitus type 1 ===
- Genetic causes of diabetes mellitus type 1
- Environmental causes of diabetes mellitus type 1

=== Causes of diabetes mellitus type 2 ===
- Genetic causes of diabetes mellitus type 2
- Lifestyle causes of diabetes mellitus type 2

== Related conditions ==
- Impaired glucose tolerance –

== Preventing diabetes mellitus ==
=== Preventing diabetes mellitus type 1 ===
Currently, there is no known way to prevent diabetes mellitus type 1. However, onset of diabetes mellitus type 1 may be delayed by about two years by administering Teplizumab.

=== Preventing diabetes mellitus type 2 ===
Preventing diabetes mellitus type 2 – entails a lifestyle with a routine, regime, or self care program that includes the following:

- Maintaining a healthy weight –
- Proper nutrition –
- Regular physical exercise – in addition to helping to maintain a healthy weight, sufficient vigorous physical exercise increases cells' sensitivity to insulin, and can thus prevent and possibly revert insulin resistance.
- Medication – specific medications have been shown to be able to prevent type 2 diabetes. However, the disease can often be delayed through proper nutrition and regular exercise.

== Treating diabetes mellitus ==
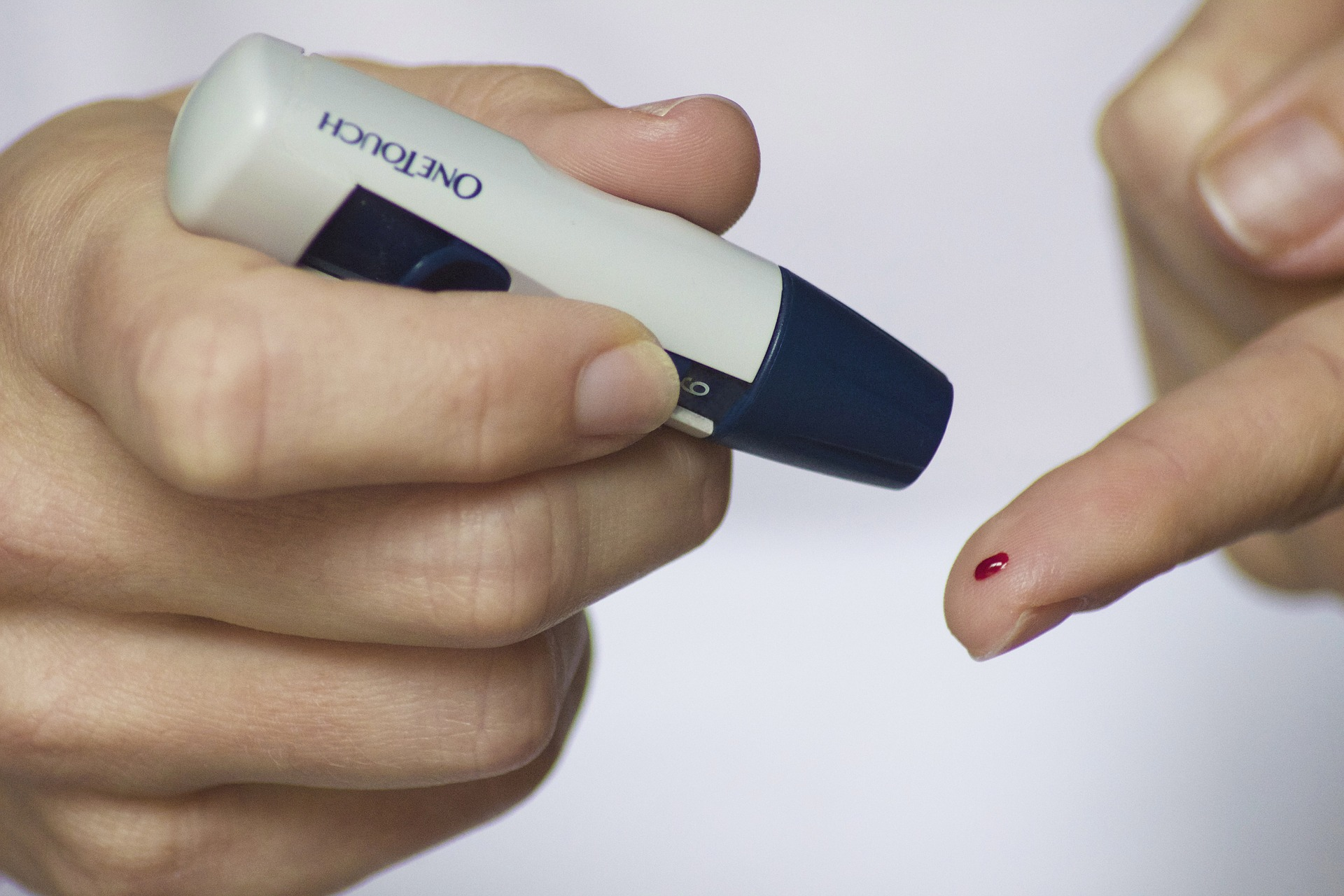
- Testing blood sugar levels
  Insulin therapy
  - Insulin
  - Insulin pumps
  - Manual injections
    - Syringe
    - Insulin pen

=== Low-carbohydrate diet ===
- Carbohydrate
  - Monosaccharide (simple carbohydrate) –
- Insulin index
- Glycemic index
- Glycemic load

==== Low-carbohydrate dietary programs ====
- Atkins diet
  - Atkins Nutritionals
  - Robert Atkins (nutritionist)
- William Banting
- Richard K. Bernstein
- Diabetic diet (low-carb)
- CarbSmart ice cream products from Breyers
- Ketogenic diet
- Low-glycemic index diet
- Meatatarian – (all meat diet, generally not recommended by some nutritionists)
- Montignac diet
- No-carbohydrate diet
- Pritikin diet
- Shirataki noodles
- South Beach Living
- Stillman diet
- Sugar Busters!
- Gary Taubes
- Zone diet

=== Pancreatic islet cell replacement therapy ===
- VX-880, developed by Vertex Pharmaceuticals, is a stem cell-derived therapy for people with diabetes mellitus type 1.
  - VX-880 involves replacement of non-functioning insulin-producing cells with transplanted functional cells. VX-880 is in clinical trials but has already resulted in patients with diabetes mellitus type 1 achieving insulin independence.

== History of diabetes mellitus ==
History of diabetes influence

== Persons influential in relation to diabetes mellitus ==
- Paul Langerhans
- Joseph von Mering
- Oskar Minkowski
- Edward Albert Sharpey-Schafer
- Frederick Banting
- Charles Best
- James Collip
- Harold Percival Himsworth
- Thorburn Brailsford Robertson

== See also ==
- Outline of health
  - Outline of exercise
  - Outline of nutrition
  - Outline of medicine
