= Fibrocalculous pancreatopathy =

Fibrocalculous pancreatopathy (FCPP) is a secondary form of diabetes mellitus of unresolved etiology that has historically been considered an issue specific to the impoverished agricultural tropics of India, but also occurs in the countries of Bangladesh, China, and Ethiopia.

== See also ==
- Climatic regions of India
- Diseases of poverty
- Poverty in China
- Poverty in India
