= Type 5 diabetes =

Form of diabetes mellitus related to malnutrition

Malnutrition-related diabetes mellitus (MRDM), also known as Type 5 diabetes and formerly as Type J diabetes, is a type of diabetes mellitus characterized by reduced insulin production (similar to Type 1 diabetes). However, in MRDM, the insulin deficiency is primarily linked to childhood malnutrition rather than autoimmune damage to the pancreatic beta cells. Unlike Type 1 diabetes, patients with Type 5 diabetes do not develop ketonuria or ketosis.

== History ==
MRDM diabetes was first described in Jamaica in 1955. It is most commonly seen in young men in low- and middle-income countries who have a body mass index (BMI) below 19. They are often mistakenly diagnosed with Type 1 diabetes, but these patients do not develop ketonuria or ketosis, despite high blood glucose levels and a need for insulin.

In 1985, the World Health Organization (WHO) officially classified "malnutrition-related diabetes mellitus" as a distinct type of diabetes. However, in 1999, this category was abolished, with the WHO citing a lack of evidence that malnutrition or protein deficiency directly causes diabetes.

Nevertheless, on April 8, 2025, MRDM was reestablished and named Type 5 by a vote during the World Diabetes Congress of the International Diabetes Federation (IDF) in Bangkok, Thailand.

== Diagnosis ==
Diagnostic criteria for Type 5 diabetes are under development. In the spring of 2025, the International Diabetes Federation (IDF) tasked a working group, which includes Meredith Hawkins, a professor of medicine at Albert Einstein College of Medicine in The Bronx, New York, with developing official diagnostic and therapeutic guidelines for Type 5 diabetes.

== Management ==
As of July 2025, there are no clear guidelines for treating Type 5 diabetes.

Some evidence suggests that very small amounts of insulin combined with oral medications may be most effective. It is crucial to differentiate Type 5 diabetes from Type 1 diabetes, as administering too much insulin can quickly be fatal. The diet for patients should include significantly higher amounts of protein and fewer carbohydrates, with special attention paid to correcting micronutrient deficiencies.
