= Hearing loss in diabetes =

Hearing loss in diabetes is a form of hearing impairment resulting from type 2 diabetes mellitus. Type 2 diabetes mellitus (T2DM) is associated with various microvascular and macrovascular complications. Microvascular complications include diabetic retinopathy, neuropathy, and nephropathy, while macrovascular complications involve cerebrovascular disease, peripheral vascular disease, and coronary heart disease. T2DM also affects other systems such as the hepatic and digestive systems, musculoskeletal system, and can impact mental health and cognitive functioning. These complications significantly contribute to the disease's overall burden. The rising prevalence of T2DM is expected to increase the number of individuals experiencing these complications. Additionally, similar pathophysiological mechanisms may lead to damage in the neural system or vasculature of the inner ear, resulting in hearing impairment. Numerous population-based studies have demonstrated a significant association between T2DM and hearing loss, particularly sensorineural hearing loss, which tends to worsen as T2DM progresses.

The Centre for Disease Control and Prevention (CDC) recommends a baseline hearing evaluation upon diagnosis of diabetes and a complete audiological evaluation every two years following that. The American Speech-Language-Hearing Association and the World Health Organization's Guidelines on Integrated Care for Older People recommend screening and provision of amplification among older adults.

Among these complications, sensorineural hearing loss is significant, with its severity correlating with T2DM progression. Hearing loss impacts quality of life, causing economic and emotional strain. It is an independent risk factor for dementia, cognitive decline, social withdrawal, anxiety, depression, and physical decline, especially in older adults. Both T2DM and hearing loss independently increase dementia risk. Among patients with diabetes, age, nephropathy, and neuropathy were associated with hearing loss.

Identifying high-risk individuals for complications like hearing loss can enable early diagnosis and intervention. This article explores the association between hearing loss and diabetes and discusses screening guidelines and tools for diabetic patients.

== Pathophysiological mechanisms of hearing impairment in T2DM ==
Hearing impairment in type 2 diabetes mellitus (T2DM) is thought to be caused by several pathophysiological mechanisms, including microangiopathy, neuropathy, and mitochondrial damage. Microangiopathy in diabetes results from glycoprotein accumulation and endothelial damage, affecting highly microvascular structures like the cochlea. Studies have linked factors such as HbA1c levels, uncontrolled blood sugar, diabetic neuropathy, retinopathy and nephropathy to an increased risk of hearing loss in diabetic patients. The stria vascularis in the cochlea, crucial for fluid homeostasis and sound transduction, can be damaged by microangiopathy. This damage includes thickened capillary walls and lumen narrowing, as well as degeneration of the stria vascularis observed in patients with T2DM.

Outer hair cells, essential for sound amplification, can be damaged in diabetes, leading to hearing impairment. Thickening of the capillary basement membrane and a reduction in ganglion cells within the spiral ganglion have been noted, impacting the neural transmission pathways. Oxidative stress and increased free radical production in diabetics contribute to neural damage and delayed neural conduction, affecting hearing.

Hyperglycemia can lead to chronic cochlear damage or impaired endolymph homeostasis, affecting pure-tone audiometry (PTA) thresholds. Reactive oxygen species (ROS) like nitric oxide are higher in diabetics with hearing loss, indicating oxidative stress's role in hearing impairment. Additional factors such as dyslipidemia, insulin resistance, and hypertension can further negatively impact hearing in individuals with diabetes.

== Screening for hearing loss in adults with diabetes ==
Recent studies highlight the lower odds of hearing aid use in older adults with diabetes or hypertension, emphasizing the need to identify and address hearing impairment in this population. Even subclinical hearing loss can lead to cognitive impairment and depressive symptoms, with a minimal increase in the pure-tone audiometry (PTA) hearing threshold linked to higher risks of social isolation and cognitive decline. Timely diagnosis and hearing aid use can significantly improve quality of life, reduce depression, and mitigate cognitive decline.

Despite its prevalence, hearing loss is under-diagnosed and under-treated, particularly in older adults who may underestimate their impairment. Early diagnosis and intervention are crucial for better compliance and treatment outcomes in diabetic patients. Up to 75% of adults who could benefit from hearing aids do not use them, despite evidence showing that hearing aid users experience less depression and social isolation, better cognitive function and improved relationships.

The CDC recommends baseline hearing evaluations upon diabetes diagnosis, followed by comprehensive audiological evaluations at least every two years, with more frequent evaluations for high-risk patients. The American Speech-Language-Hearing Association (ASHA) suggests screenings once per decade for adults, increasing to once every three years after age 50. The World Health Organization also recommends hearing loss screening and amplification for older adults. However, the American Diabetes Association does not currently recommend routine hearing screening for diabetic patients.

There is debate about universal hearing screening for adults. The US Preventive Services Task Force and the American Academy of Family Physicians find insufficient evidence to recommend routine screening for asymptomatic adults over 50. The UK National Screening Committee does not support a national screening program for this age group. Nonetheless, some experts suggest screening those with perceived hearing loss or known risk factors.

Screening tools for hearing loss in diabetic patients include clinical tests like the whispered voice or finger rub tests, single-question screenings, the Hearing Handicap Inventory for the Elderly-Screening (HHIE-S), and hand-held audiometers. Single-question screening has shown reasonable accuracy, and the HHIE-S has been validated with high sensitivity and specificity for older adults. Smartphone apps for hearing tests, such as uHear and hearWHO, also show promise with high accuracy.
