= Double diabetes =

Medical condition

The term double diabetes refers to when somebody has type 1 diabetes and clinical features for insulin resistance or family history of type 2 diabetes. It is also called type 1.5 diabetes, mixed-type diabetes or hybrid diabetes. However, it is still unrecognized by current guidelines. Many but not all people with double diabetes are obese or overweight.

Multiple pieces of evidence show those with double diabetes mellitus have increased risks for complications from the condition in the future. Furthermore, some people with double diabetes can reverse the type 2 version of their diabetes or the involved insulin resistance but the type 1 is permanent; the latter cannot be reversed.

Similar to type 1 diabetes and to type 2, side effects such as diabetic ulcers, gangrene, kidney disease, stroke and heart disease are complications that sometimes affect people in the later stages of the disease if the problem is not controlled. But the risks for these and other complications can be reduced by eating a healthy diet, talking with a doctor and exercise. Most people with double diabetes need to also take diabetic medications. Almost all people with type 1 and some with type 2 need to inject insulin, while many others with type 2 will need to eventually use oral medications. But some type 2 diabetics can control the condition with diet and exercise alone. Double diabetes, however, requires a mix of medications and exercise.

Double diabetes can take place at almost any age, even for children and teenagers. However, type 2 diabetes more often occurs in people middle-age or older. But in recent decades, overweight children, teenagers and young adults are also developing double or type 2 diabetes, in particular due to family history, substandard diet or physical inactivity.
