= Latent autoimmune diabetes in adults =

- Other names: LADA, late-onset autoimmune diabetes of adulthood, adult-onset autoimmune diabetes
- Universal blue circle symbol for diabetes
- Pronunciation: /daɪəbiːtiːs/
- Specialty: Endocrinology

Latent autoimmune diabetes in adults (LADA) is an autoimmune disease with gradual or slow destruction of pancreatic beta cells (β-cells). It is a form of type 1 diabetes (T1D) that manifests in adulthood, rather than childhood or adolescence.

Due to the adult onset of LADA, as well as the relative preservation of insulin secretion at diagnosis and its slower rate of progression compared to classic T1D, LADA is often misdiagnosed as type 2 diabetes mellitus (T2D) which is a metabolic disorder rather than an autoimmune disease. The concept of LADA was first introduced in 1993. Though sometimes colloquially referred to as "type 1.5 diabetes" due to its sharing some clinical and metabolic characteristics of both T1D and T2D, LADA is strictly defined under the rubric of T1D by the American Diabetes Association (ADA) as an autoimmune form of diabetes. Most individuals with LADA have circulating islet autoantibodies which are indicative of progressive β-cell loss and may help predict the rate of disease progression. Misdiagnosis of LADA can lead to inappropriate treatment, as patients may be managed as having T2D rather than their underlying autoimmune condition.

== Pathophysiology ==
The pathophysiology of LADA is similar to that of type 1 diabetes, in that it involves autoimmune destruction of pancreatic β-cells; however, this process occurs at a slower rate than in type 1 diabetes. This causes a gradual decline in insulin production; for a period individuals are not insulin-dependent. The immune-mediated destruction of β-cells varies in rate and extent among individuals, leading to different clinical courses.

== Symptoms and signs ==
The signs and symptoms of LADA are similar to those of other types of diabetes (e.g., glucosuria, polyuria), but the onset tends to be more gradual than in classic T1D, as the condition results from a long-term autoimmune process that progressively destroys pancreatic β-cells.

== Risk factors ==
There is limited research on LADA and its etiology. As with both T1D and T2D, the risk of developing LADA depends on both genetic and environmental factors. Genetic risk factors for LADA are similar to T1D, e.g. it is affected by the HLA complex, but also genetic variants associated with T2D have been identified in LADA. LADA has several lifestyle risk factors in common with T2D, such as obesity, physical inactivity, smoking and consumption of sweetened beverages, all of which are linked to insulin resistance.

Obesity has been shown to increase the risk of LADA in several studies, and one study showed that the risk was particularly high in combination with having diabetes in the family. Less physical activity increases the risk of developing LADA. A Swedish study showed that low birth weight, in addition to increasing the risk of T2D, increases the risk of LADA.

Although smoking has been shown to increase the risk of T2D and coffee consumption to decrease it, the results regarding these products and LADA are unclear. However, results from two studies based on the same population seem to indicate that coffee consumption increases the risk of LADA. Sweetened beverages and processed red meat have been shown to increase the risk of LADA, while consumption of fatty fish has been shown to have a protective effect.

== Diagnosis ==
A fasting blood sugar level of ≥ 7.0 mmol / L (126 mg/dL) is used in the general diagnosis of diabetes. There are no clear guidelines for the diagnosis of LADA, but the criteria often used are that the patient develops the disease in adulthood, does not need insulin treatment for the first 6 months after diagnosis, and has autoantibodies in the blood.

It is recommended that glutamic acid decarboxylase autoantibody (GADA), islet cell autoantibody (ICA), insulinoma-associated (IA-2) autoantibody, and zinc transporter autoantibody (ZnT8) testing be performed to correctly diagnose diabetes. Persons with LADA typically have low, although sometimes moderate, levels of C-peptide as the disease progresses. Those with insulin resistance or type 2 diabetes are more likely to have high levels of C-peptide.

=== Autoantibodies ===
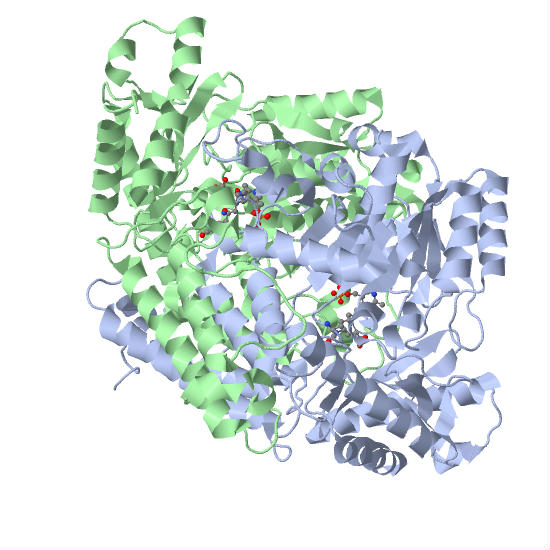
Destruction of Glutamate decarboxylase (pictured here) via autoantibodies is strongly linked with LADA type 1 diabetes.

Glutamic acid decarboxylase autoantibodies (GADA), islet cell autoantibodies (ICA), insulinoma-associated (IA-2) autoantibodies, and zinc transporter autoantibodies (ZnT8) are all associated with LADA; GADAs are commonly found in cases of diabetes mellitus type 1.

The presence of islet cell complement fixing autoantibodies also aids in a differential diagnosis between LADA and type 2 diabetes. Persons with LADA often test positive for ICA, whereas type 2 diabetics only seldom do.

Persons with LADA usually test positive for glutamic acid decarboxylase antibodies, whereas in type 1 diabetes these antibodies are more commonly seen in adults rather than in children. In addition to being useful in making an early diagnosis for type 1 diabetes mellitus, GAD antibodies tests are used for differential diagnosis between LADA and type 2 diabetes and may also be used for differential diagnosis of gestational diabetes, risk prediction in immediate family members for type 1, as well as a tool to monitor prognosis of the clinical progression of type 1 diabetes.

== Management ==
Diabetes is a chronic disease, i.e. it cannot be cured, but symptoms and complications can be minimized with proper treatment. Diabetes can lead to elevated blood sugar levels, which in turn can lead to damage to the heart, blood vessels, kidneys, eyes and nerves. There are very few studies on how to treat LADA, specifically, which is probably due to difficulties in classifying and diagnosing the disease. LADA patients often do not need insulin treatment immediately after being diagnosed because their own insulin production decreases more slowly than T1D patients, but in the long run they will need it. About 80% of all LADA patients initially misdiagnosed with type 2 (and who have GAD antibodies) will become insulin-dependent within 3 to 15 years (according to differing LADA sources).

The treatment for Type 1 diabetes/LADA is exogenous insulin to control glucose levels, prevent further destruction of residual beta cells, reduce the possibility of diabetic complications, and prevent death from diabetic ketoacidosis (DKA). Although LADA may appear to initially respond to similar treatment (lifestyle and medications) as type 2 diabetes, this will not halt or slow the progression of beta cell destruction; people with LADA will eventually become insulin-dependent. People with LADA have insulin resistance comparable to long-term type 1 diabetes; some studies found that people with LADA have less insulin resistance than those with type 2 diabetes, but others found no difference.

A Cochrane systematic review in 2011 showed that treatment with Sulphonylurea did not improve control of glucose levels more than insulin at 3 nor 12 months of treatment. The review found evidence that treatment with Sulphonylurea could lead to earlier insulin dependence, with 30% of cases requiring insulin at 2 years. When studies measured fasting C-peptide, no intervention influenced its concentration, but insulin maintained concentration better than Sulphonylurea. The authors also examined a study utilizing Glutamic Acid Decarboxylase formulated with aluminium hydroxide (GAD65), which showed improvements in C-peptide levels that were maintained for 5 years. Vitamin D with insulin also demonstrated steady fasting C-peptide levels in the vitamin group, with the same levels declining in the insulin-only group at a 12-month follow-up. One study examining the effects of insulin together with Chinese remedies on fasting C-peptide on a 3-month follow-up did not show a difference compared to insulin alone. However, the studies available to be included in this review presented considerable flaws in quality and design.

== Genetics ==
LADA appears to share genetic risk factors with both T1D and T2D, including susceptibility loci related to HLA-associated immune function as well as loci associated with insulin resistance, but is genetically distinct from both. Within the LADA patient group, a phenotypic heterogeneity has been observed with varying degrees of insulin resistance and autoimmunity. As a result, LADA is considered a heterogeneous and complex genetic disorder.

== Comparison ==
LADA differs from both type 1 and type 2 diabetes. It has a later onset and slower progression than classic type 1 diabetes and is characterized by autoimmune-mediated β-cell destruction, while also exhibiting features of type 2 diabetes due to progressive insulin deficiency over time. Genetic testing can help distinguish LADA from monogenic forms of diabetes (e.g., MODY), which lack autoimmune markers and do not share the same genetic profile.

== Prevalence ==
Since there is no regular autoantibody screening, patients with LADA are at risk of being diagnosed with type 2 diabetes, which makes it difficult to estimate the prevalence of LADA. Globally, it is estimated that about 8.5% of adults have some form of diabetes and it is estimated that LADA accounts for about 3-12% of all adult diabetes cases. 2015 estimates suggest that up to 10–20% of people with diabetes have LADA.

== History ==
Although type 1 diabetes has been identified as an autoimmune disease since the 1970s, the concept of latent autoimmune diabetes mellitus was not noted until 1993, when it was used to describe slow-onset type 1 autoimmune diabetes occurring in adults. This followed the concept that GAD autoantibodies were a feature of type 1 diabetes and not type 2 diabetes.
