= C-peptide =

Insulin production indicator protein

Identifiers
CAS Number	59112-80-0
3D model (JSmol)	Interactive image
ChemSpider	17288968
MeSH	C-Peptide
PubChem CID	16132309
UNII	O2J76Y002M
CompTox Dashboard (EPA)	DTXSID401059551
- InChI: InChI=1S/C112H179N35O46/c1-51(2)32-66(144-104(184)63(21-29-92(170)171)137-85(161)46-127-99(179)59(16-23-72(114)148)134-87(163)49-131-111(191)95(55(9)10)146-106(186)62(18-25-74(116)150)135-86(162)47-129-103(183)70(36-94(174)175)145-105(185)64(22-30-93(172)173)136-84(160)45-124-98(178)58(113)15-27-90(166)167)102(182)126-41-80(156)119-38-77(153)122-50-89(165)147-31-13-14-71(147)110(190)130-44-81(157)132-56(11)96(176)123-39-78(154)121-43-83(159)140-68(34-53(5)6)108(188)141-60(17-24-73(115)149)100(180)128-48-88(164)139-67(33-52(3)4)107(187)133-57(12)97(177)143-69(35-54(7)8)109(189)142-61(20-28-91(168)169)101(181)125-40-79(155)118-37-76(152)120-42-82(158)138-65(112(192)193)19-26-75(117)151/h51-71,95H,13-50,113H2,1-12H3,(H2,114,148)(H2,115,149)(H2,116,150)(H2,117,151)(H,118,155)(H,119,156)(H,120,152)(H,121,154)(H,122,153)(H,123,176)(H,124,178)(H,125,181)(H,126,182)(H,127,179)(H,128,180)(H,129,183)(H,130,190)(H,131,191)(H,132,157)(H,133,187)(H,134,163)(H,135,162)(H,136,160)(H,137,161)(H,138,158)(H,139,164)(H,140,159)(H,141,188)(H,142,189)(H,143,177)(H,144,184)(H,145,185)(H,146,186)(H,166,167)(H,168,169)(H,170,171)(H,172,173)(H,174,175)(H,192,193)/t56-,57-,58-,59-,60-,61-,62-,63-,64-,65-,66-,67-,68-,69-,70-,71-,95-/m0/s1 Key: XTUNIGNWBZZIPT-NTMYLOQBSA-N; InChI=1/C112H179N35O46/c1-51(2)32-66(144-104(184)63(21-29-92(170)171)137-85(161)46-127-99(179)59(16-23-72(114)148)134-87(163)49-131-111(191)95(55(9)10)146-106(186)62(18-25-74(116)150)135-86(162)47-129-103(183)70(36-94(174)175)145-105(185)64(22-30-93(172)173)136-84(160)45-124-98(178)58(113)15-27-90(166)167)102(182)126-41-80(156)119-38-77(153)122-50-89(165)147-31-13-14-71(147)110(190)130-44-81(157)132-56(11)96(176)123-39-78(154)121-43-83(159)140-68(34-53(5)6)108(188)141-60(17-24-73(115)149)100(180)128-48-88(164)139-67(33-52(3)4)107(187)133-57(12)97(177)143-69(35-54(7)8)109(189)142-61(20-28-91(168)169)101(181)125-40-79(155)118-37-76(152)120-42-82(158)138-65(112(192)193)19-26-75(117)151/h51-71,95H,13-50,113H2,1-12H3,(H2,114,148)(H2,115,149)(H2,116,150)(H2,117,151)(H,118,155)(H,119,156)(H,120,152)(H,121,154)(H,122,153)(H,123,176)(H,124,178)(H,125,181)(H,126,182)(H,127,179)(H,128,180)(H,129,183)(H,130,190)(H,131,191)(H,132,157)(H,133,187)(H,134,163)(H,135,162)(H,136,160)(H,137,161)(H,138,158)(H,139,164)(H,140,159)(H,141,188)(H,142,189)(H,143,177)(H,144,184)(H,145,185)(H,146,186)(H,166,167)(H,168,169)(H,170,171)(H,172,173)(H,174,175)(H,192,193)/t56-,57-,58-,59-,60-,61-,62-,63-,64-,65-,66-,67-,68-,69-,70-,71-,95-/m0/s1 Key: XTUNIGNWBZZIPT-NTMYLOQBBL
- SMILES: CC(C)CC(C(=O)NC(C)C(=O)NC(CC(C)C)C(=O)NC(CCC(=O)O)C(=O)NCC(=O)NCC(=O)NCC(=O)NC(CCC(=O)N)C(=O)O)NC(=O)CNC(=O)C(CCC(=O)N)NC(=O)C(CC(C)C)NC(=O)CNC(=O)CNC(=O)C(C)NC(=O)CNC(=O)C1CCCN1C(=O)CNC(=O)CNC(=O)CNC(=O)C(CC(C)C)NC(=O)C(CCC(=O)O)NC(=O)CNC(=O)C(CCC(=O)N)NC(=O)CNC(=O)C(C(C)C)NC(=O)C(CCC(=O)N)NC(=O)CNC(=O)C(CC(=O)O)NC(=O)C(CCC(=O)O)NC(=O)CNC(=O)C(CCC(=O)O)N

Properties
Chemical formula	C_{129}H_{211}N_{35}O_{48}
Molar mass	3020.29 g/mol
- Except where otherwise noted, data are given for materials in their standard state (at 25 °C [77 °F], 100 kPa). verify (what is ?) Infobox references

The connecting peptide, or C-peptide, is a short 31-amino-acid polypeptide that connects insulin's A-chain to its B-chain in the proinsulin molecule. In the context of diabetes or hypoglycemia, a measurement of C-peptide blood serum levels can be used to distinguish between different conditions with similar clinical features.

In the insulin synthesis pathway, first preproinsulin is translocated into the endoplasmic reticulum of beta cells of the pancreas as one polypeptide comprising the regions of the A-chain, C-peptide, B-chain, and signal sequence. The signal sequence is cleaved from the N-terminus of the peptide by a signal peptidase, leaving proinsulin. After proinsulin is packaged into vesicles in the Golgi apparatus (beta-granules), the C-peptide is removed, leaving the A-chain and B-chain bound together by disulfide bonds, that constitute the insulin molecule.

C-peptide has virtually no affinity for the insulin receptor, however, it is known to promote the activity of at least two enzymes - the sodium–potassium pump and nitric oxide synthase - downstream of binding to a membrane structure (presumably a G protein-coupled receptor). Nevertheless, the physiological significance of these effects of C-peptide is unresolved.

== History ==
Proinsulin C-peptide was first described in 1967 in connection with the discovery of the insulin biosynthesis pathway. Isolation of bovin C-peptide, determination of sequence, preparation of human C-peptide were done in 1971. C-peptide serves as a linker between the A- and the B- chains of insulin and facilitates the efficient assembly, folding, and processing of insulin in the endoplasmic reticulum. Equimolar amounts of C-peptide and insulin are then stored in secretory granules of the pancreatic beta cells and both are eventually released to the portal circulation. Initially, the sole interest in C-peptide was as a marker of insulin secretion and has, as such, been of great value in furthering the understanding of the pathophysiology of type 1 and type 2 diabetes. The first documented use of the C-peptide test was in 1972. In the first decade of 21st century, C-peptide has been found to be a bioactive peptide in its own right, with effects on microvascular blood flow and tissue health.

== Function ==
=== Cellular effects of C-peptide ===
C-peptide has been shown to bind to the surface of a number of cell types such as neuronal, endothelial, fibroblast and renal tubular, at nanomolar concentrations to a receptor that is likely G-protein-coupled. The signal activates Ca^{2+}-dependent intracellular signaling pathways such as MAPK, PLCγ, and PKC, leading to upregulation of a range of transcription factors as well as eNOS and Na+K+ATPase activities. The latter two enzymes are known to have reduced activities in patients with type I diabetes and have been implicated in the development of long-term complications of type I diabetes such as peripheral and autonomic neuropathy.

In vivo studies in animal models of type 1 diabetes have established that C-peptide administration results in significant improvements in nerve and kidney function. Thus, in animals with early signs of diabetes-induced neuropathy, C peptide treatment in replacement dosage results in improved peripheral nerve function, as evidenced by increased nerve conduction velocity, increased nerve Na+,K+ ATPase activity, and significant amelioration of nerve structural changes. Likewise, C-peptide administration in animals that had C-peptide deficiency (type 1 model) with nephropathy improves renal function and structure; it decreases urinary albumin excretion and prevents or decreases diabetes-induced glomerular changes secondary to mesangial matrix expansion. C-peptide also has been reported to have anti-inflammatory effects as well as aid repair of smooth muscle cells. A recent epidemiologic study suggests a U-shaped relationship between C-peptide levels and risk of cardiovascular disease.

== Clinical uses of C-peptide testing ==
Patients with diabetes may have their C-peptide levels measured as a means of distinguishing type 1 diabetes from type 2 diabetes or maturity-onset diabetes of the young (MODY). Measuring C-peptide can help to determine how much of their own natural insulin a person is producing as C-peptide is secreted in equimolar amounts to insulin. C-peptide levels are measured instead of insulin levels because C-peptide can assess a person's own insulin secretion even if they receive insulin injections, and because the liver metabolizes a large and variable amount of insulin secreted into the portal vein but does not metabolise C-peptide, meaning blood C-peptide may be a better measure of portal insulin secretion than insulin itself. A very low C-peptide confirms Type 1 diabetes and insulin dependence and is associated with high glucose variability, hyperglycaemia and increased complications. The test may be less sufficient to diagnose or recognize a subgroup of type 1 diabetes named Latent autoimmune diabetes in adults (LADA), whose C-peptide levels may not be as low as those in typical Type 1 diabetes while may sometimes overlap with those seen in type 2 diabetes, and Beta-cell antibody testing is needed for better diagnosis in this case.

C-peptide can be used for differential diagnosis of hypoglycemia. The test may be used to help determine the cause of hypoglycaemia (low glucose), values will be low if a person has taken an overdose of insulin but not suppressed if hypoglycaemia is due to an insulinoma or sulphonylureas.

Factitious (or factitial) hypoglycemia may occur secondary to the surreptitious use of insulin. Measuring C-peptide levels will help differentiate a healthy patient from a diabetic one.

C-peptide may be used for determining the possibility of gastrinomas associated with Multiple Endocrine Neoplasm syndromes (MEN 1). Since a significant number of gastrinomas are associated with MEN involving other hormone producing organs (pancreas, parathyroids, and pituitary), higher levels of C-peptide together with the presence of a gastrinoma suggest that organs besides the stomach may harbor neoplasms.

C-peptide levels may be checked in women with polyendocrine metabolic ovarian syndrome (PMOS) to help determine degree of insulin resistance.

Ultrasensitive C-peptide assays have made it possible to detect very low levels of circulating C-peptide even in patients with longstanding type-1 diabetes. Studies have demonstrated that the presence of residual C-peptide in longstanding type-1 diabetes is associated with a lower risk for developing microvascular complications and a significant reduction in incidence of severe hypoglycaemia.

== Therapeutics ==
Therapeutic use of C-peptide has been explored in small clinical trials in diabetic kidney disease. Creative Peptides, Eli Lilly, and Cebix all had drug development programs for a C-peptide product. Cebix had the only ongoing program until it completed a Phase IIb trial in December 2014 that showed no difference between C-peptide and placebo, and it terminated its program and went out of business.
