= Lifestyle causes of type 2 diabetes =

A number of lifestyle factors are known to be important to the development of type 2 diabetes including: obesity, physical activity, diet, stress, and urbanization. Excess body fat underlies 64% of cases of diabetes in men and 77% of cases in women. A number of dietary factors such as sugar sweetened drinks and the type of fat in the diet appear to play a role.

In one study, those who had high levels of physical activity, a healthy diet, did not smoke, and consumed alcohol in moderation had an 82% lower rate of diabetes. When a normal weight was included, the rate was 89% lower. In this study, a healthy diet was defined as one high in fiber, with a high polyunsaturated to saturated fat ratio, lower trans fats consumption, and a lower mean glycemic index.

== Dietary ==
The composition of dietary fat intake is linked to diabetes risk; decreasing consumption of saturated fats and trans fatty acids while replacing them with unsaturated fats may decrease the risk. Sugar sweetened drinks appear to increase the risk of type 2 diabetes both through their role in obesity and potentially through a direct effect. A higher proportion of ultra-processed food in the diet was associated with a higher risk of type 2 diabetes in a large ten-year study published in 2019.

== Obesity ==
Obesity has been found to contribute to approximately 55% of cases of type 2 diabetes; chronic obesity leads to increased insulin resistance that can develop into type 2 diabetes, most likely because adipose tissue (especially that in the abdomen around internal organs) is a source of several chemical signals, hormones and cytokines, to other tissues. Inflammatory cytokines such as TNFα may activate the NF-κB pathway which has been linked to the development of insulin resistance. Gene expression promoted by a diet of fat and glucose, as well as high levels of inflammation related cytokines found in the obese, can result in cells that "produce fewer and smaller mitochondria than is normal," and are thus prone to insulin resistance. Fat tissue has also been shown to be involved in managing much of the body's response to insulin and control of uptake of sugar. It secretes RBP4 which increases insulin resistance by blocking the action of insulin in muscle and liver. Fat cells also secrete adiponectin which acts in an opposite way to RBP4 by improving the action of insulin, however, engorged fat cells secrete it in lower amount than normal fat cells. The obese therefore may have higher level of RBP4 but lower level of adiponectin, both of which increase the risk of developing diabetes.

However, different fat tissues behave differently. Visceral fat, which is found around organs such as the intestines and liver, releases signalling molecules directly into blood heading into the liver where glucose is absorbed and processed, while subcutaneous fat under the skin is much less metabolically active. The visceral fat is located in the abdomen in the waist region, large waist circumference and high waist-to-hip ratio are therefore often used as indications of an increased risk of type 2 diabetes.

The increased rate of childhood obesity between the 1960s and 2000s is believed to have led to the increase in type 2 diabetes in children and adolescents.

== Sleep ==
Studies have shown that a reduction in sleep is associated with a significant increase in the incidence of type 2 diabetes. This could account for the increased incidence of diabetes in developed countries in the last decades, since "the causes of this pandemic are not fully explained by changes in traditional lifestyle factors such as diet and physical activity", and "one behavior that seems to have developed during the past few decades and has become highly prevalent, particularly amongst Americans, is sleep curtailment".

In addition, it has been shown that certain minority populations, such as Native Hawaiians/Pacific Islanders or American Indians/Alaska Natives, report higher rates of suboptimal sleep, potentially leading to higher rates of type 2 diabetes.

== Prenatal environment ==
Research also suggests intrauterine growth restriction (IUGR) or prenatal undernutrition (macro- and micronutrient) as another probable factor. Studies of those who were small or disproportionately thin or short at birth, or suffered prenatal exposure during period of famine such as the Dutch Hunger Winter (1944–1945) during World War II, have shown that they are prone to higher rates of diabetes.

== Other ==
Environmental toxins may contribute to recent increases in the rate of type 2 diabetes. A weak positive correlation has been found between the concentration in the urine of bisphenol A, a constituent of some plastics, and the incidence of type 2 diabetes.
