= Glucagon-like peptide-1 receptor =

Receptor activated by peptide hormone GLP-1

GLP1R
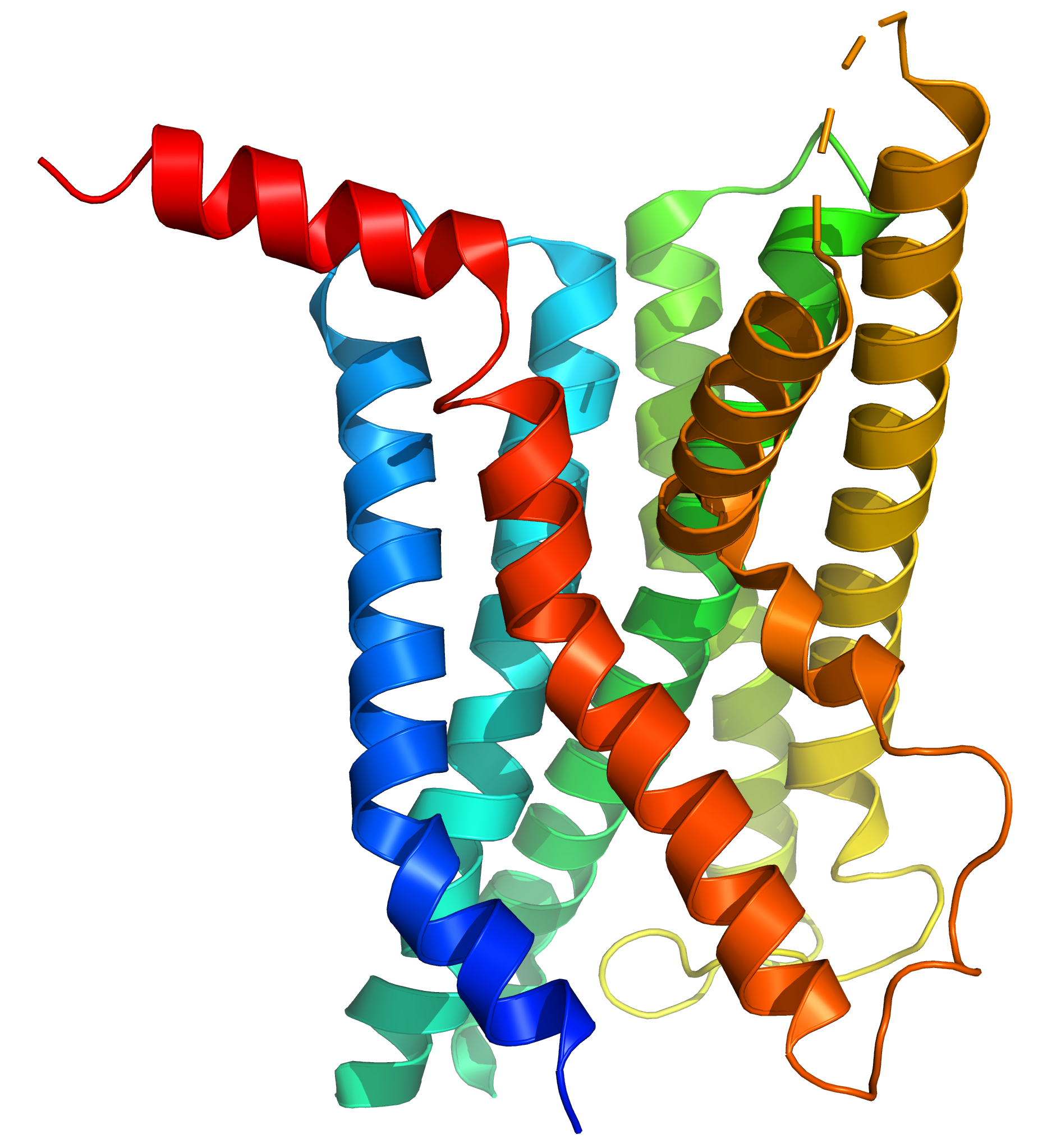

Identifiers
- Aliases: GLP1R, glucagon-like peptide 1 receptor, GLP-1, GLP-1-R, GLP-1R, glucagon like peptide 1 receptor
- External IDs: OMIM: 138032; MGI: 99571; GeneCards: GLP1R
Available structures
PDB	Ortholog search: PDBe RCSB
PDB	List of PDB id codes 3C59, 3C5T, 3IOL, 4ZGM

Gene location (Human)
Chr.	Chromosome 6 (human)
Band	6p21.2	Start	39,048,781 bp
Band	6p21.2	End	39,091,303 bp

Gene location (Mouse)
Chr.	Chromosome 17 (mouse)
Band	17 A3.3|17 15.8 cM	Start	31,120,791 bp
Band	17 A3.3|17 15.8 cM	End	31,159,765 bp
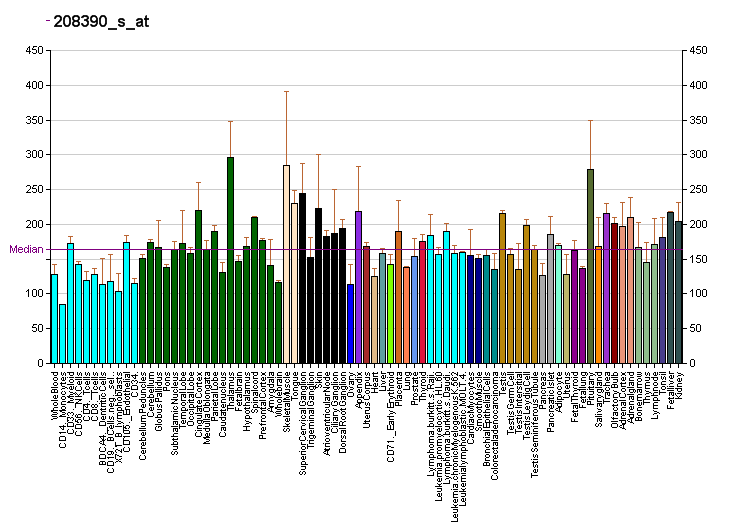

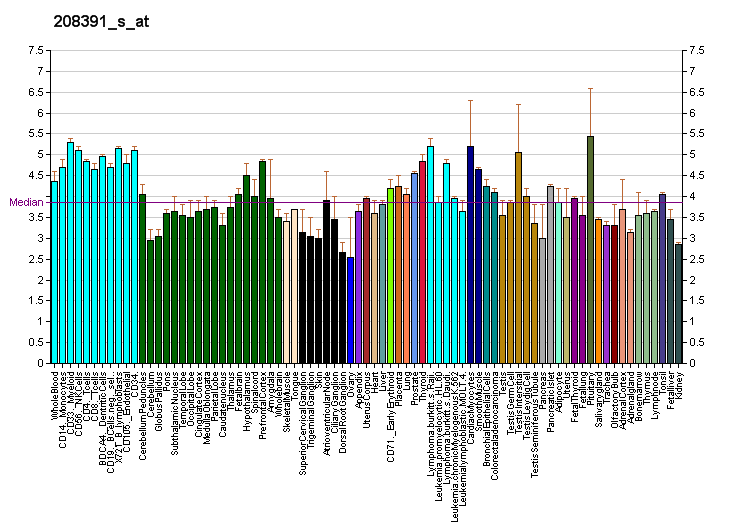

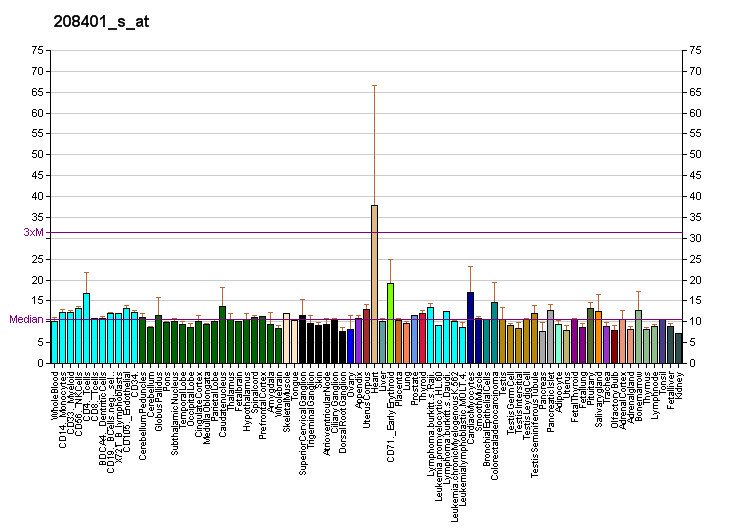
RNA expression pattern
Bgee	Human / Mouse (ortholog); Top expressed in: islet of Langerhans; sperm; vena cava; body of pancreas; oocyte; periodontal fiber; secondary oocyte; cardia; medulla oblongata; pons / Top expressed in: islet of Langerhans; supraoptic nucleus; left lung lobe; right lung lobe; lumbar subsegment of spinal cord; pontine nuclei; lateral septal nucleus; duodenum; epithelium of stomach; ganglion of vagus nerve; More reference expression data
BioGPS	More reference expression data
Gene ontology
Molecular function	G protein-coupled peptide receptor activity; G protein-coupled receptor activity; signal transducer activity; protein binding; glucagon receptor activity; transmembrane signaling receptor activity; glucagon-like peptide 1 receptor activity; peptide hormone binding
Cellular component	integral component of membrane; membrane; plasma membrane; intracellular anatomical structure; integral component of plasma membrane
Biological process	regulation of heart contraction; regulation of insulin secretion; positive regulation of cytosolic calcium ion concentration; cellular response to glucagon stimulus; activation of adenylate cyclase activity; cell surface receptor signaling pathway; positive regulation of blood pressure; learning or memory; cAMP-mediated signaling; signal transduction; adenylate cyclase-activating G protein-coupled receptor signaling pathway; G protein-coupled receptor signaling pathway; response to psychosocial stress
Sources:Amigo / QuickGO
Orthologs
Databases	NCBI: entry; OMA: entry
Species	Human	Mouse
Entrez	2740	14652
Ensembl	ENSG00000112164	ENSMUSG00000024027
UniProt	P43220	O35659
RefSeq (mRNA)	NM_002062	NM_021332
RefSeq (protein)	NP_002053	NP_067307
Location (UCSC)	Chr 6: 39.05 – 39.09 Mb	Chr 17: 31.12 – 31.16 Mb
PubMed search
- Wikidata
View/Edit Human	View/Edit Mouse

The glucagon-like peptide-1 receptor (GLP1R) is a G protein-coupled receptor (GPCR) found on beta cells of the pancreas and on neurons of the brain. It is involved in the control of blood sugar level by enhancing insulin secretion. In humans it is synthesised by the gene GLP1R, which is present on chromosome 6. It is a member of the glucagon receptor family of GPCRs. GLP1R is composed of two domains, one extracellular (ECD) that binds the C-terminal helix of GLP-1, and one transmembrane domain (TMD) that binds the N-terminal region of GLP-1. In the TMD domain a fulcrum of polar residues regulates the biased signaling of the receptor while the transmembrane helical boundaries and extracellular surface are a trigger for biased agonism.

== Structure ==
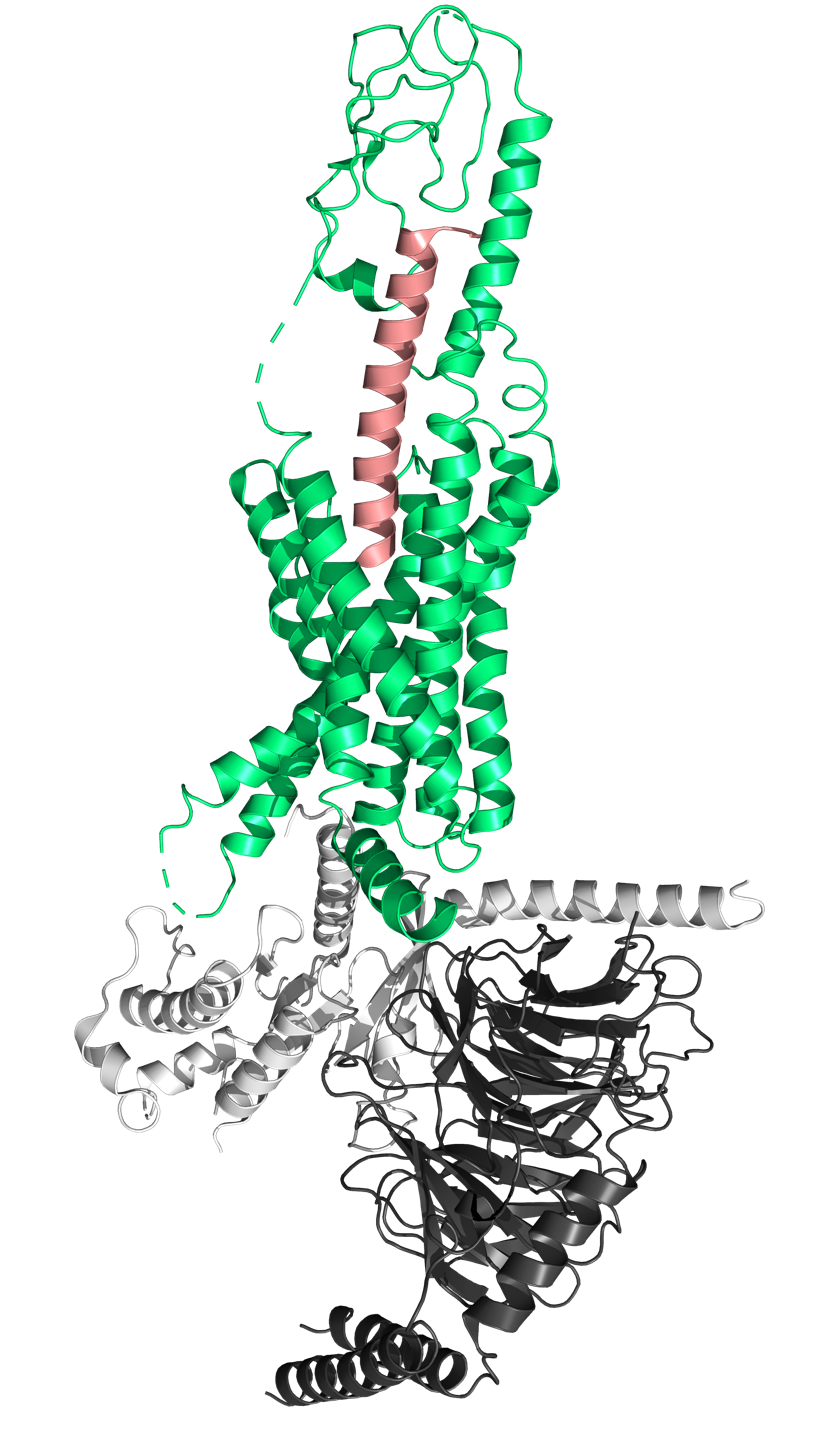
Structure of GLP1R-G protein complex bound to tirzepatide. Based on PDB entry 7RGP. Tirzepatide shown in red, GLP1R shown in green, G alpha subunit shown in white, G beta-gamma complex shown in dark gray.

The GLP-1 receptor is a transmembrane protein composed of seven alpha-helical transmembrane domains (TM1-TM7), an extracellular N-terminus, and an intracellular C-terminus. It belongs to the class B family of G protein-coupled receptors, also known as secretin-like receptors. The extracellular N-terminus contains key regions involved in ligand recognition and binding. It undergoes conformational changes upon ligand binding, leading to activation of intracellular signaling cascades. The intracellular C-terminus interacts with G proteins and other signaling molecules to initiate cellular responses.

== Function ==
Glucagon-like peptide-1 (GLP-1) is a hormone consisting of 30 amino acids. GLP-1 is released by intestinal L cells when nutrients are consumed. GLP1R is expressed on beta cells in the pancreas. Binding of GLP-1 to GLP1R has multiple effects, including enhancing insulin secretion from pancreatic beta cells in response to glucose, increasing insulin expression, preventing beta-cell apoptosis, promoting the formation of new beta cells, reducing glucagon secretion, slowing down stomach emptying, promoting satiety, and improving glucose disposal in peripheral tissues.

GLP1R is also expressed in the brain where it is involved in the control of appetite.

== Mechanism of action ==
Upon binding to its ligand GLP-1, the GLP-1 receptor activates intracellular signaling pathways that regulate insulin secretion, glucose metabolism, and satiety.

In pancreatic beta cells, GLP-1 receptor activation enhances glucose-stimulated insulin secretion. This occurs through the activation of adenylyl cyclase, leading to increased intracellular levels of cyclic AMP (cAMP). The rise in cAMP activates protein kinase A (PKA), which promotes insulin exocytosis and enhances beta cell survival and proliferation. GLP-1 receptor signaling in pancreatic alpha cells reduces glucagon secretion, further contributing to glucose lowering.

Activation of GLP-1 receptor delays the rate at which the stomach empties, leading to increased satiety and feeling of fullness.

Activation of the GLP-1 receptor in the brain promotes feelings of satiety.

== Ligands ==
GLP1R binds glucagon-like peptide-1 (GLP1) and glucagon as its natural endogenous agonists.

Agonists

- GLP-1 – endogenous in humans
- glucagon – endogenous in humans
- oxyntomodulin
- amycretin/ zenagamtide
- UBT251
- exendin-4
- exenatide
- lixisenatide
- albiglutide
- beinaglutide
- dulaglutide
- efpeglenatide
- langlenatide
- liraglutide
- polyethylene glycol/PEG- loxenatide
- semaglutide
- taspoglutide
- ecnoglutide
- utreglutide
- glepaglutide
- apraglutide
- maridebart cafraglutide
- tirzepatide
- pegapamodutide
- mazdutide
- survodutide
- bamadutide
- pemvidutide
- cotadutide
- retatrutide
- Lithium chloride
- Cinchonine
- grutalumab
- dapiglutide
- DA1726
- GX-G6
- GZR18
- HRS9531/ KAI-9531/ Ribupatide
- PB718
- RAY1225
- VCT220
- VK2735
- BLX7006
- supaglutide/ efsubaglutide
- ASC30
- HRS7535
- Danuglipron
- Aleniglipron
- Lotiglipron
- Orforglipron (non peptide partial agonist)
- Conveglipron
- Elecoglipron/ AZD 5004/ ECC 5004
- CT-996
- CT-388/ Enicepatide
- CT-868
- HEC88473
- HS-10535
- UBT251
- efinopegdutide
- efocipegtrutide
- Berobenatide
- NNC9204-1706
- TG103
- YP05002/YP-05002

Antagonists:

- [9-39]-GLP-1
- T-0632
- GLP1R0017
- avexitide / exendin 9-39

Allosteric modulators:

Positive

- BETP

Negative

- HTL26119
- PF-06372222

== Clinical significance ==
GLP-1 receptor agonists are a class of medications that mimic the actions of the endogenous incretin hormone GLP-1, and are used in type 2 diabetes and obesity.
