= GLP1 poly-agonist peptides =

Class of drugs used to treat diabetes

GLP1 poly-agonist peptides are a class of drugs that activate multiple peptide hormone receptors including the glucagon-like peptide-1 (GLP-1) receptor. These drugs are developed for the same indications as GLP-1 receptor agonists—especially obesity, type 2 diabetes, and metabolic dysfunction–associated steatotic liver disease. Unlike GLP-1 mono-agonists, which target only the GLP-1 receptor, poly-agonists activate two or more incretin receptors, such as the gastric inhibitory polypeptide (GIP) receptor, which have distinct features but work together in metabolic regulation. GIP and GLP-1 are both naturally released from the gastrointestinal tract after eating, but act on different receptor distributions across tissues. GLP-1 receptors are concentrated in the pancreas, brain, and gastrointestinal tract, while GIP receptors are found primarily in the pancreas, brain, and adipose tissue.

In healthy people, the combined incretin effect of GIP and GLP-1 accounts for around 50–70% of post-meal insulin secretion. This effect is substantially reduced in people with type 2 diabetes, providing evidence for therapies that activate both hormones.

Poly-agonists are expected to provide superior efficacy with fewer adverse effects compared to GLP-1 mono-agonists, which are dose-limited by gastrointestinal disturbances. The effectiveness of multi-receptor agonists could possibly equal or exceed that of bariatric surgery. The first such drug to receive approval is tirzepatide, a dual agonist of GLP-1 and GIP receptors.

== Mechanism of action ==
GLP-1 poly-agonist peptides work by activating two hormone receptors rather than one. The two receptors targeted are both triggered naturally after eating, but they act on different parts of the body and play complementary roles in regulating blood sugar, appetite, and fat metabolism.

In the pancreas, both receptors stimulate insulin release in response to elevated blood glucose, but through slightly different cellular pathways. Activating both at once produces a stronger insulin response than either receptor alone. The two receptors also balance each other in their effects on glucagon; GIP raises glucagon when blood sugar is too low, while GLP-1 suppresses glucagon when blood sugar is too high.

In fat tissue, GIP promotes the removal of triglycerides from the bloodstream, while GLP-1 encourages fat breakdown through signals sent via the central nervous system. Both hormones also reduce fat build up in the liver and lower insulin resistance.

== GLP-1 and GIP receptor dual agonists ==
Tirzepatide is a dual agonist, targeting the GLP-1 and GIP receptors and given as a once-weekly injection. The FDA approved it for type 2 diabetes in May 2022.

In the SURPASS-2 clinical trial, tirzepatide was compared directly against semaglutide, a GLP-1 mono-agonist, in nearly 1,900 adults with type 2 diabetes. Tirzepatide outperformed semaglutide at all doses in both reducing blood sugar and weight loss. At the highest dose, 60% of patients on tirzepatide achieved good blood sugar control and at least 10% weight loss, compared to only 22% of patients that did so on semaglutide. Side effects were mostly mild gastrointestinal symptoms, similar to other drugs in the GLP-1 class.

== GLP-1 and glucagon receptor dual agonists ==
Glucagon is a hormone that generally opposes the action of insulin. It increases blood glucose by stimulating the production of glucose in the liver via glycogenolysis (breakdown of glycogen) and gluconeogenesis (production of glucose from non-carbohydrate sources). Glucagon also increases the breakdown of lipids and amino acids and the production of ketones. Unlike currently approved weight loss drugs, glucagon receptor agonists increase energy expenditure. Combination GLP-1/glucagon receptor agonists provide the thermogenic benefits of glucagon activation while almost eliminating hyperglycemia induced by glucagon receptor activation. Several such drugs have reached human trials for obesity, diabetes, and metabolic dysfunction–associated steatotic liver disease but adverse effects have hampered development. The most advanced of these drugs is mazdutide which is in a phase III trial as of 2023.

== GLP-1, GIP, and glucagon receptor triple agonists ==
Following the discovery of GLP-1/GIP and GLP-1/glucagon dual agonists, it was hoped that a triple agonist would provide additive or synergistic metabolic benefits. A clinical trial of the triple agonist retatrutide found an average 24.2% weight reduction in the highest dosage group after 24 weeks. Another clinical trial of triple agonist UBT-251 also found an average weight reduction of 19.7% after 24 weeks.

== Conjugates ==
Attaching other hormones such as estrogen, thyroid hormone (T3), and dexamethasone to GLP-1 or glucagon restrict the activity of the attached hormone to cells that express GLP-1 or glucagon.

GLP-1 and amylin receptor agonist conjugates have also been tested in preclinical trials.

== GLP-1 and neuropeptide Y multi-agonists ==
In 2023, researchers disclosed the discovery of multiple peptides that activated the GLP-1 receptor, neuropeptide Y receptor Y1, and neuropeptide Y receptor Y2. Since neuropeptide Y receptors were a previous anti-obesity target, it is hoped that the combination might be more efficacious than GLP-1 receptor agonists.

== See also ==
- Cagrilintide/semaglutide
- Insulin icodec/semaglutide
