= Rejuva =

Gene therapy
- Vector: AAV9
- Delivery method: Injection

Rejuva is a gene therapy which is under development for the treatment of obesity and diabetes. It is an adeno-associated virus (AAV)-based gene therapy which involves an engineered variant of human insulin promotor and which aims to permanently increase nutrient-responsive secretion glucagon-like peptide-1 (GLP-1) by pancreatic β-cells. The therapy is administered via a 25-gauge needle delivery system guided by endoscopic ultrasound in a one-time outpatient treatment. It is intended as a permanent alternative to GLP-1 agonists like semaglutide. Rejuva is under development by Fractyl Health and is in the preclinical research stage of development.
