= VK2735 =

Experimental drug

VK2735 is a dual agonist of the GLP-1 receptor and GIP receptor, with a similar mechanism of action as tirzepatide, which acts on the same receptors. Both injectable and oral forms are being developed by Viking Therapeutics.
