= HRS9531 =

Experimental drug

HRS9531 is an experimental GLP-1 and GIPR dual agonist developed by Jiangsu Hengrui.
