= CT-868 =

Clinical data
- Other names: CT868; RG-6641; RG6641
- Routes of administration: Subcutaneous injection
- Drug class: GLP-1 receptor agonist; GIP receptor agonist; Antidiabetic agent; Anti-obesity agent

CT-868 is an experimental "biased dual GLP-1 and GIP receptor modulator that exhibits no arrestin coupling or receptor internalization at either receptor". It is developed by Carmot Therapeutics for diabetes and obesity. The drug is taken by subcutaneous injection.
