= Macupatide =

Clinical data
- Other names: LY3532226
- Drug class: Gastric inhibitory polypeptide receptor agonist

Identifiers
- CAS Number: 2923558-68-1
- UNII: YWF427CA5D

Chemical and physical data
- Formula: C_{232}H_{357}N_{49}O_{72}
- Molar mass: 4984.679 g·mol^{−1}

Macupatide (LY3532226) is a glucose-dependent insulinotropic polypeptide (GIP) receptor agonist under development for diabetes and obesity.
