= MDR-001 =

Experimental drug

Clinical data
- Drug class: GLP-1 receptor agonist

Identifiers
- CAS Number: 3113403-91-8

MDR-001 is an experimental GLP-1 receptor agonist that is delivered orally.
