= Maridebart cafraglutide =

Experimental medication

Clinical data
- Other names: AMG 133

Legal status
- Legal status: Investigational

Identifiers
- CAS Number: 2760218-55-9
- IUPHAR/BPS: 13316
- DrugBank: DB19339
- UNII: Z24U3U73HN
- ChEMBL: ChEMBL5314751

Maridebart cafraglutide (also known as MariTide; developmental name AMG 133) is an investigational drug developed by Amgen for the treatment of obesity. It is an agonist of the GLP-1 receptor (GLP-1R) and an antagonist of the glucose-dependent insulinotropic polypeptide receptor (GIPR). Namely, MariTide consists of a monoclonal antibody against GIPR conjugated to two peptidic GLP-1R agonist molecules via amino acid linkers. In a preliminary trial, AMG 133 resulted in a 14.5 percent weight loss after 12 weeks at the highest dose tested.
