= Conveglipron =

Clinical data
- Other names: HDM-1002; HDM1002
- Routes of administration: Oral
- Drug class: GLP-1 receptor agonist; Antidiabetic agent; Antiobesity agent

Identifiers
- IUPAC name: 2-[[4-[6-[[2-fluoro-4-(oxetan-3-yl)phenyl]methoxy]-2-pyridinyl]piperidin-1-yl]methyl]-3-[[(2S)-oxetan-2-yl]methyl]benzimidazole-5-carboxylic acid
- CAS Number: 2886728-09-0
- PubChem CID: 166540968
- ChemSpider: 129787062
- UNII: G2VF4KQ6GS
- ChEMBL: ChEMBL5590455

Chemical and physical data
- Formula: C_{33}H_{35}FN_{4}O_{5}
- Molar mass: 586.664 g·mol^{−1}
- 3D model (JSmol): Interactive image
- SMILES: C1CO[C@@H]1CN2C3=C(C=CC(=C3)C(=O)O)N=C2CN4CCC(CC4)C5=NC(=CC=C5)OCC6=C(C=C(C=C6)C7COC7)F
- InChI: InChI=1S/C33H35FN4O5/c34-27-14-22(25-18-41-19-25)4-5-24(27)20-43-32-3-1-2-28(36-32)21-8-11-37(12-9-21)17-31-35-29-7-6-23(33(39)40)15-30(29)38(31)16-26-10-13-42-26/h1-7,14-15,21,25-26H,8-13,16-20H2,(H,39,40)/t26-/m0/s1; Key:SFKAXUUDIGSMBK-SANMLTNESA-N

Conveglipron (INN; developmental code name HDM1002) is a glucagon-like peptide-1 (GLP-1) receptor agonist which is under development for the treatment of type 2 diabetes, obesity, and diabetes mellitus. It is taken orally. The drug is a small molecule and is a selective and highly potent full agonist of the GLP-1 receptor with antihyperglycemic and antiobesity effects in animals. Conveglipron is under development by Huadong Medicine in China. As of January 2026, it is in phase 3 clinical trials for type 2 diabetes, phase 2 trials for obesity, and phase 1 trials for diabetes mellitus.
