= Pemvidutide =

Chemical compound

Clinical data
- Other names: ALT-801; MD-1373; SP-1373

Legal status
- Legal status: Investigational

Identifiers
- CAS Number: 2538014-94-5
- UNII: A35F525WBG
- KEGG: D12861

Chemical and physical data
- Formula: C_{182}H_{275}N_{39}O_{54}
- Molar mass: 3873.421 g·mol^{−1}

Pemvidutide is an experimental dual GLP-1/glucagon receptor agonist for the treatment of MASH, obesity, AUD, and ALD developed by Altimmune, a clinical-stage biopharmaceutical company based in Gaithersburg, Maryland.

The drug reduced LDL-C in a clinical trial and does not require dose titration as with GLP-1 mono agonists. The company's latest Phase 2 trial also showed improvement in MASH combined with significant weight loss.
