= Efinopegdutide =

Clinical data
- Other names: MK-6024

Legal status
- Legal status: Investigational

Identifiers
- CAS Number: 2055640-93-0
- DrugBank: DB15077
- UNII: DR6P1M58PO
- KEGG: D11607
- ChEMBL: ChEMBL4297576

Efinopegdutide (MK-6024) is a dual agonist of the glucagon and GLP-1 receptors. It is being developed by Merck for non-alcoholic fatty liver disease. It was also developed for type 2 diabetes and obesity but these indications were discontinued.
