= Efocipegtrutide =

Clinical data
- Other names: HM15211

Legal status
- Legal status: Investigational

Identifiers
- CAS Number: 2513399-19-2
- UNII: TUI1MDD9F6
- ChEMBL: ChEMBL5095149

Efocipegtrutide (HM15211) is a triple agonist of the glucagon, GIP, and glucagon-like peptide 1 receptors. It is being studied for obesity and nonalcoholic steatohepatitis.
