= CT-388 =

Identifiers
- CAS Number: 2919675-94-6

CT-388 is a "biased" dual GLP-1 and GIP receptor agonist/modulator with minimal to no beta-arrestin coupling at either receptor and is designed to be administered as once weekly subcutaneous injection. In a 24-week trial participants averaged 18.8 percent placebo adjusted weight loss. The drug is developed by Roche/Genentech.
