= Ecnoglutide =

Experimental drug

Clinical data
- Other names: XW003

Legal status
- Legal status: Investigational

Identifiers
- IUPAC name: 18-[[(1S)-4-[2-[2-[2-[2-[2-[2-[[(5S)-5-[[(2S,3S)-2-[[(2S)-2-[[(2S)-2-[[(2S)-2-[[(2S)-2-[[(2S)-2-[[(2S)-5-amino-2-[[(2S)-2-[[(2S)-2-[[(2S)-2-[[(2S)-2-[[(2S)-2-[[(2S)-2-[[(2S)-2-[[(2S)-2-[[(2S)-2-[[(2S,3R)-2-[[(2S)-2-[[(2S,3R)-2-[[2-[[(2S)-2-[[(2S)-2-[[(2S)-2-amino-3-(1H-imidazol-4-yl)propanoyl]amino]-3-methylbutanoyl]amino]-4-carboxybutanoyl]amino]acetyl]amino]-3-hydroxybutanoyl]amino]-3-phenylpropanoyl]amino]-3-hydroxybutanoyl]amino]-3-hydroxypropanoyl]amino]-3-carboxypropanoyl]amino]-3-methylbutanoyl]amino]-3-hydroxypropanoyl]amino]-3-hydroxypropanoyl]amino]-3-(4-hydroxyphenyl)propanoyl]amino]-4-methylpentanoyl]amino]-4-carboxybutanoyl]amino]-4-carboxybutanoyl]amino]-5-oxopentanoyl]amino]propanoyl]amino]propanoyl]amino]-5-carbamimidamidopentanoyl]amino]-4-carboxybutanoyl]amino]-3-phenylpropanoyl]amino]-3-methylpentanoyl]amino]-6-[[(2S)-1-[[(2S)-1-[[(2S)-1-[[(2S)-5-carbamimidamido-1-[[2-[[(2S)-5-carbamimidamido-1-(carboxymethylamino)-1-oxopentan-2-yl]amino]-2-oxoethyl]amino]-1-oxopentan-2-yl]amino]-3-methyl-1-oxobutan-2-yl]amino]-4-methyl-1-oxopentan-2-yl]amino]-3-(1H-indol-3-yl)-1-oxopropan-2-yl]amino]-6-oxohexyl]amino]-2-oxoethoxy]ethoxy]ethylamino]-2-oxoethoxy]ethoxy]ethylamino]-1-carboxy-4-oxobutyl]amino]-18-oxooctadecanoic acid
- CAS Number: 2459531-73-6
- PubChem CID: 162625103
- DrugBank: DB19019
- ChemSpider: 129306901
- UNII: KM6YM7L8LH

Chemical and physical data
- Formula: C_{194}H_{304}N_{48}O_{61}
- Molar mass: 4284.841 g·mol^{−1}
- 3D model (JSmol): Interactive image
- SMILES: CC[C@H](C)[C@@H](C(=O)N[C@@H](CCCCNC(=O)COCCOCCNC(=O)COCCOCCNC(=O)CC[C@@H](C(=O)O)NC(=O)CCCCCCCCCCCCCCCCC(=O)O)C(=O)N[C@@H](CC1=CNC2=CC=CC=C21)C(=O)N[C@@H](CC(C)C)C(=O)N[C@@H](C(C)C)C(=O)N[C@@H](CCCNC(=N)N)C(=O)NCC(=O)N[C@@H](CCCNC(=N)N)C(=O)NCC(=O)O)NC(=O)[C@H](CC3=CC=CC=C3)NC(=O)[C@H](CCC(=O)O)NC(=O)[C@H](CCCNC(=N)N)NC(=O)[C@H](C)NC(=O)[C@H](C)NC(=O)[C@H](CCC(=O)N)NC(=O)[C@H](CCC(=O)O)NC(=O)[C@H](CCC(=O)O)NC(=O)[C@H](CC(C)C)NC(=O)[C@H](CC4=CC=C(C=C4)O)NC(=O)[C@H](CO)NC(=O)[C@H](CO)NC(=O)[C@H](C(C)C)NC(=O)[C@H](CC(=O)O)NC(=O)[C@H](CO)NC(=O)[C@H]([C@@H](C)O)NC(=O)[C@H](CC5=CC=CC=C5)NC(=O)[C@H]([C@@H](C)O)NC(=O)CNC(=O)[C@H](CCC(=O)O)NC(=O)[C@H](C(C)C)NC(=O)[C@H](CC6=CNC=N6)N
- InChI: InChI=1S/C194H304N48O61/c1-17-109(12)160(188(295)225-125(51-40-41-73-204-148(254)101-302-83-82-301-80-78-206-149(255)102-303-84-81-300-79-77-205-144(250)68-62-132(191(298)299)218-145(251)55-36-28-26-24-22-20-18-19-21-23-25-27-29-37-56-150(256)257)171(278)231-138(90-117-93-210-122-50-39-38-49-120(117)122)177(284)228-134(86-105(4)5)178(285)239-158(107(8)9)186(293)224-124(53-43-75-208-193(199)200)167(274)211-95-146(252)217-123(52-42-74-207-192(197)198)166(273)213-97-156(268)269)241-179(286)136(87-114-45-32-30-33-46-114)229-174(281)131(66-72-154(264)265)221-170(277)126(54-44-76-209-194(201)202)219-164(271)111(14)215-163(270)110(13)216-169(276)128(61-67-143(196)249)220-172(279)129(64-70-152(260)261)222-173(280)130(65-71-153(262)263)223-175(282)133(85-104(2)3)227-176(283)135(89-116-57-59-119(248)60-58-116)230-182(289)140(98-243)234-184(291)142(100-245)235-187(294)159(108(10)11)240-181(288)139(92-155(266)267)232-183(290)141(99-244)236-190(297)162(113(16)247)242-180(287)137(88-115-47-34-31-35-48-115)233-189(296)161(112(15)246)237-147(253)96-212-168(275)127(63-69-151(258)259)226-185(292)157(106(6)7)238-165(272)121(195)91-118-94-203-103-214-118/h30-35,38-39,45-50,57-60,93-94,103-113,121,123-142,157-162,210,243-248H,17-29,36-37,40-44,51-56,61-92,95-102,195H2,1-16H3,(H2,196,249)(H,203,214)(H,204,254)(H,205,250)(H,206,255)(H,211,274)(H,212,275)(H,213,273)(H,215,270)(H,216,276)(H,217,252)(H,218,251)(H,219,271)(H,220,279)(H,221,277)(H,222,280)(H,223,282)(H,224,293)(H,225,295)(H,226,292)(H,227,283)(H,228,284)(H,229,281)(H,230,289)(H,231,278)(H,232,290)(H,233,296)(H,234,291)(H,235,294)(H,236,297)(H,237,253)(H,238,272)(H,239,285)(H,240,288)(H,241,286)(H,242,287)(H,256,257)(H,258,259)(H,260,261)(H,262,263)(H,264,265)(H,266,267)(H,268,269)(H,298,299)(H4,197,198,207)(H4,199,200,208)(H4,201,202,209)/t109-,110-,111-,112+,113+,121-,123-,124-,125-,126-,127-,128-,129-,130-,131-,132-,133-,134-,135-,136-,137-,138-,139-,140-,141-,142-,157-,158-,159-,160-,161-,162-/m0/s1; Key:DJMLKAVQDZZBNC-NYHUXPQOSA-N

Ecnoglutide (XW003) is a GLP-1 agonist being developed for the treatment of obesity and type 2 diabetes. In preclinical trials, "Ecnoglutide showed a favorable potency, pharmacokinetic, and tolerability profile, as well as a simplified manufacturing process" compared to other GLP-1 agonist lipopeptides.

A phase 3 trial published in 2025 showed 9-13% reduction in bodyweight versus placebo over a 48-week treatment, varying by ecnoglutide dose.

In January 2026, ecnoglutide injection is approved for marketing in China.
