= Insulin-degrading enzyme =

Enzyme found in humans

IDE

Identifiers
- Aliases: IDE, INSULYSIN, insulin degrading enzyme
- External IDs: OMIM: 146680; MGI: 96412; GeneCards: IDE
Available structures
PDB	Ortholog search: PDBe RCSB
PDB	List of PDB id codes 2G47, 2G48, 2G49, 2G54, 2G56, 2JBU, 2JG4, 2WBY, 2WC0, 2WK3, 2YPU, 3CWW, 3E4A, 3E4Z, 3E50, 3H44, 3HGZ, 3N56, 3N57, 3OFI, 3QZ2, 4DTT, 4DWK, 4GS8, 4GSC, 4GSF, 4IFH, 4IOF, 4LTE, 4M1C, 4Q5Z, 4QIA, 4RAL, 4PES, 4PF7, 4PF9, 4PFC, 4NXO, 4RE9, 5CJO
Enzyme activity
EC #	BRENDA	ExPASy	KEGG	MetaCyc
3.4.24.56	↗	↗	↗	↗

Gene location (Human)
Chr.	Chromosome 10 (human)
Band	10q23.33	Start	92,451,684 bp
Band	10q23.33	End	92,574,096 bp
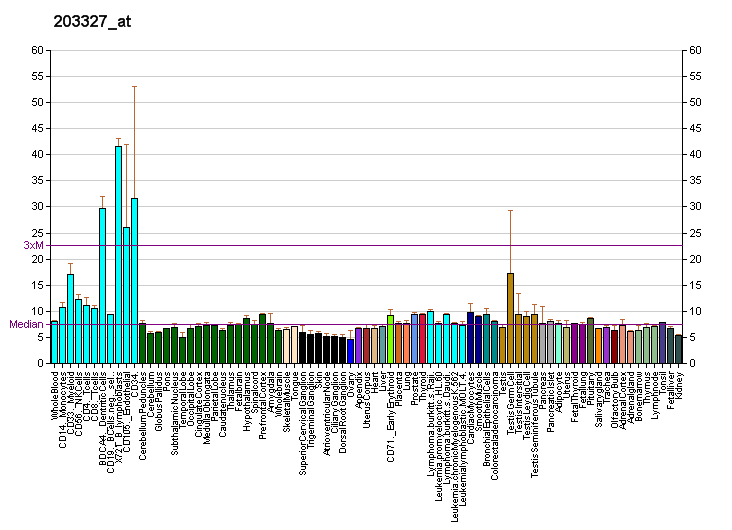

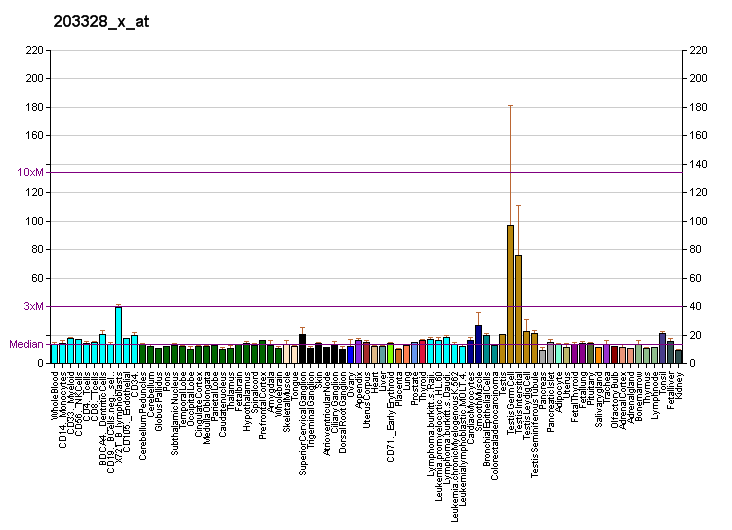

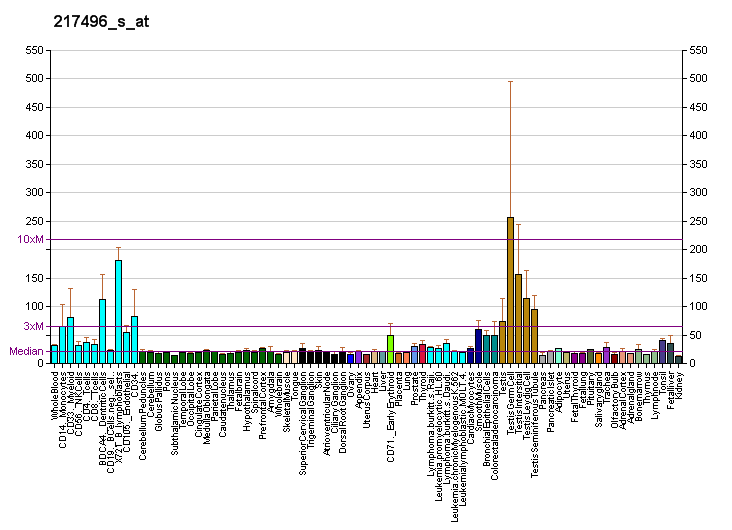
RNA expression pattern
Bgee	Human / Mouse (ortholog); Top expressed in: skin of thigh; secondary oocyte; glutes; Skeletal muscle tissue of rectus abdominis; human penis; triceps brachii muscle; right ventricle; biceps brachii; Skeletal muscle tissue of biceps brachii; vulva / n/a; More reference expression data
BioGPS	More reference expression data
Gene ontology
Molecular function	nucleotide binding; protein homodimerization activity; virus receptor activity; peptide binding; zinc ion binding; amyloid-beta binding; insulin binding; metal ion binding; protein binding; peptide hormone binding; peptidase activity; ATPase activity; beta-endorphin binding; catalytic activity; ubiquitin binding; metalloendopeptidase activity; signaling receptor binding; hydrolase activity; ATP binding; metallopeptidase activity; ubiquitin-dependent protein binding; endopeptidase activity
Cellular component	cytoplasm; cytosol; membrane; plasma membrane; peroxisome; extracellular region; cell surface; cytosolic proteasome complex; mitochondrion; nucleus; extracellular space; peroxisomal matrix; external side of plasma membrane; basolateral plasma membrane; extracellular exosome
Biological process	negative regulation of proteolysis; insulin receptor signaling pathway; insulin metabolic process; bradykinin catabolic process; determination of adult lifespan; protein heterooligomerization; hormone catabolic process; amyloid-beta metabolic process; proteolysis; positive regulation of protein oligomerization; viral entry into host cell; metabolism; proteolysis involved in cellular protein catabolic process; ubiquitin recycling; viral process; protein homooligomerization; protein homotetramerization; insulin catabolic process; protein targeting to peroxisome; protein catabolic process; positive regulation of protein catabolic process; amyloid-beta clearance; amyloid-beta clearance by cellular catabolic process; regulation of aerobic respiration; antigen processing and presentation of endogenous peptide antigen via MHC class I; peptide catabolic process
Sources:Amigo / QuickGO
Orthologs
Databases	NCBI: entry; OMA: entry
Species	Human	Mouse
Entrez	3416	15925
Ensembl	ENSG00000119912	ENSMUSG00000056999
UniProt	P14735	Q8CGB9
RefSeq (mRNA)	NM_001165946; NM_004969; NM_001322793; NM_001322794; NM_001322795 NM_001322796; NM_001322797	NM_031156
RefSeq (protein)	NP_001159418; NP_001309722; NP_001309723; NP_001309724; NP_001309725 NP_001309726; NP_004960	NP_112419
Location (UCSC)	Chr 10: 92.45 – 92.57 Mb	n/a
PubMed search
- Wikidata
View/Edit Human	View/Edit Mouse

Insulin-degrading enzyme (IDE) (also known as insulinase, insulin protease, or insulysin) is a large zinc-binding protease of the M16 metalloprotease family of enzymes. It is known to cleave multiple short polypeptides that vary considerably in sequence, including insulin and glucagon-like peptide-1 (GLP-1). Other members of this family include the mitochondrial processing peptidase and presequence protease. Insulin-degrading enzyme is coded for in the human by the IDE gene.

== Gene ==
The gene IDE has 28 exons and is located on chromosome 10 q23-q25.

== Structure ==
Due to alternative splicing, insulin-degrading enzyme has two isoforms. Isoform1 is ~118 kDa in size and composed of 1019 amino acids while the isoform 2 is ~54.2 kDa size and composed of 464 amino acids (missing 1-555 amino acids). The calculated theoretical pI of this protein isoform is 6.26. Structural studies of IDE by Shen et al. have provided insight into the functional mechanisms of the protease. Reminiscent of the previously determined structure of the bacterial protease pitrilysin, the IDE crystal structure reveals defined N and C terminal units that form a proteolytic chamber containing the zinc-binding active site. In addition, it appears that IDE can exist in two conformations: an open conformation, in which substrates can access the active site, and a closed state, in which the active site is contained within the chamber formed by the two concave domains. Targeted mutations that favor the open conformation result in a 40-fold increase in catalytic activity. Based upon this observation, it has been proposed that a possible therapeutic approach to Alzheimer's might involve shifting the conformational preference of IDE to the open state, and thus increasing Aβ degradation, preventing aggregation, and, ideally, preventing the neuronal loss that leads to disease symptoms.

== Function ==
IDE was first identified by its ability to degrade the B chain of the hormone insulin. This activity was observed over sixty years ago, though the enzyme specifically responsible for B chain cleavage was identified more recently. This discovery revealed considerable amino acid sequence similarity between IDE and the previously characterized bacterial protease pitrilysin, suggesting a common proteolytic mechanism. IDE, which migrates at 110 kDa during gel electrophoresis under denaturing conditions, has since been shown to have additional substrates, including the signaling peptides glucagon, TGF alpha, and β-endorphin. More recently, IDE has been identified as a protease capable of degrading glucagon-like peptide-1 (GLP-1). This study identified two IDE cleavage sites in GLP-1 and showed that IDE regulates GLP-1 availability and glucose homeostasis in mice. These findings suggest an additional role for IDE in incretin metabolism. In addition, IDE may have an important function in the retinal function due to its high expression in the outer segment of cones.

== Catalytic mechanism ==
The mechanism of the IDE enzyme remains poorly understood. The first step of one proposed mechanism includes a zinc-bound hydroxide group performing a nucleophilic attack on a carbon substrate that materializes into the intermediate INT1. In this species, we can note that the zinc-bound hydroxide is completely transferred on the carbonyl carbon of substrate as a consequence of the Zn^{2+}−OH bond breaking. In TS2, the Glu111 residue rotates to assume the right disposition to form two hydrogen bonds with the amide nitrogen and the −OH group linked to the carbon atom of substrate, thus behaving as hydrogen donor and acceptor, simultaneously. The formation of the second cited bond favors the re-establishment of the Zn^{2+}−OH bond broken previously at the INT1 level. The nucleophilic addition and the protonation of peptide amide nitrogen is a very fast process that is believed to occur as a single step in the catalytic process. The final species on the path is the product PROD. As a consequence of transfer of the proton of Glu111 onto the amide nitrogen of substrate that occurred in TS3, the peptide N—C bond is broken.

A look at the whole reaction path indicates that the rate-determining step in this process is the nucleophilic addition. After this point, the catalytic event should proceed without particular obstacles.

== Clinical significance ==
=== Alzheimer's disease ===
Considerable interest in IDE has been stimulated due to the discovery that IDE can degrade amyloid beta (Aβ), a peptide implicated in the pathogenesis of Alzheimer's disease. The underlying cause or causes of the disease are unclear, though the primary neuropathology observed is the formation of amyloid plaques and neurofibrillary tangles. One hypothesized mechanism of disease, called the amyloid hypothesis, suggests that the causative agent is the hydrophobic peptide Aβ, which forms quaternary structures that, by an unclear mechanism, cause neuronal death. Aβ is a byproduct generated as the result of proteolytic processing of the amyloid precursor protein (APP) by proteases referred to as the β and γ secretases. The physiological role of this processing is unclear, though it may play a role in nervous system development.

Numerous in vitro and in vivo studies have shown correlations between IDE, Aβ degradation, and Alzheimer's disease. Mice engineered to lack both alleles of the IDE gene exhibit a 50% decrease in Aβ degradation, resulting in cerebral accumulation of Aβ. Studies of genetically inherited forms of Alzheimer's show reduction in both IDE expression and catalytic activity among affected individuals. Despite the evident role of IDE in disease, relatively little is known about its physiological functions. These may be diverse, as IDE has been localized to several locations, including the cytosol, peroxisomes, endosomes, proteasome complexes, and the surface of cerebrovascular endothelial cells. Based upon the aforementioned observation in protein structure, it has been proposed that a possible therapeutic approach to Alzheimer's might involve shifting the conformational preference of IDE to the open state, and thus increasing Aβ degradation, preventing aggregation, and, ideally, preventing the neuronal loss that leads to disease symptoms.

=== Regulation of extracellular amyloid β-protein ===
Reports of IDE localized to the cytosol and peroxisomes have raised concerns regarding how the protease could degrade endogenous Aβ. Several studies have detected insulin-degrading activity in the conditioned media of cultured cells, suggesting the permeability of the cell membrane and thus possible release of IDE from leaky cells. Qiu and colleagues revealed the presence of IDE in the extracellular media using antibodies to the enzyme. They also quantified levels of Aβ-degrading activity using elution from column chromatography. Correlating the presence of IDE and Aβ-degrading activity in the conditioning medium confirmed that leaky membranes are responsible for extracellular IDE activity. However, other reports have indicated that it is released via exosomes.

=== Potential role in the oligomerization of Aβ ===
Recent studies have observed that the oligomerization of synthetic Aβ was completely inhibited by the competitive IDE substrate, insulin. These findings suggest that IDE activity is capable of joining of several Aβ fragments together. Qui et al. hypothesized that the Aβ fragments generated by IDE can either enhance oligomerization of the Aβ peptide or can oligomerize themselves. It is also entirely possible that IDE could mediate the degradation and oligomerization of Aβ by independent actions that have yet to be investigated.
