= Elecoglipron =

Investigational drug

Clinical data
- Other names: AZD-5004; ECC-5004

Identifiers
- IUPAC name: 3-[1-[2-[(4S)-2-(3-cyclopropyl-4-fluorophenyl)-3-[3-(4-fluoro-1-methylindazol-5-yl)-2-oxoimidazol-1-yl]-4-methyl-6,7-dihydro-4H-pyrazolo[4,3-c]pyridine-5-carbonyl]-7-[(4S)-2,2-dimethyloxan-4-yl]indolizin-3-yl]cyclopropyl]-4H-1,2,4-oxadiazol-5-one
- CAS Number: 3011682-49-5
- PubChem CID: 169644648
- IUPHAR/BPS: 14376
- UNII: G94JJ74N5Y
- KEGG: D13345

Chemical and physical data
- Formula: C_{48}H_{46}F_{2}N_{10}O_{5}
- Molar mass: 880.958 g·mol^{−1}
- 3D model (JSmol): Interactive image
- SMILES: C[C@H]1C2=C(N(N=C2CCN1C(=O)C3=C(N4C=CC(=CC4=C3)[C@H]5CCOC(C5)(C)C)C6(CC6)C7=NOC(=O)N7)C8=CC(=C(C=C8)F)C9CC9)N1C=CN(C1=O)C1=C(C2=C(C=C1)N(N=C2)C)F
- InChI: InChI=InChI=1S/C48H46F2N10O5/c1-26-39-36(53-60(30-7-8-35(49)32(22-30)27-5-6-27)42(39)59-19-18-58(46(59)63)38-10-9-37-34(40(38)50)25-51-55(37)4)12-17-56(26)43(61)33-23-31-21-28(29-13-20-64-47(2,3)24-29)11-16-57(31)41(33)48(14-15-48)44-52-45(62)65-54-44/h7-11,16,18-19,21-23,25-27,29H,5-6,12-15,17,20,24H2,1-4H3,(H,52,54,62)/t26-,29-/m0/s1; Key:JMKBTILBGROESC-WNJJXGMVSA-N

Elecoglipron is an investigational new drug that is being developed by Eccogene and AstraZeneca for the treatment of obesity, type 2 diabetes mellitus, and liver disorders. It is a glucagon-like peptide-1 receptor agonist.
