= Dapiglutide =

Chemical compound

Clinical data
- Other names: ZP 7570

Legal status
- Legal status: Investigational

Identifiers
- CAS Number: 2296814-85-0
- PubChem CID: 171934788
- DrugBank: DB19182
- UNII: J43GMI6IYW

Chemical and physical data
- Formula: C_{192}H_{302}N_{46}O_{57}
- Molar mass: 4166.793 g·mol^{−1}
- 3D model (JSmol): Interactive image
- SMILES: CC[C@H](C)[C@@H](C(=O)N[C@@H]([C@@H](C)O)C(=O)N[C@@H](CC(=O)O)C(=O)O)NC(=O)[C@H](CCCCN)NC(=O)[C@H](CC1=CNC=N1)NC(=O)[C@H](CCC(=O)N)NC(=O)[C@H]([C@@H](C)CC)NC(=O)[C@H](CC(C)C)NC(=O)[C@H](CC2=CNC3=CC=CC=C32)NC(=O)[C@H](C)NC(=O)[C@H]([C@@H](C)CC)NC(=O)[C@H](CC4=CC=CC=C4)NC(=O)[C@H](CC(=O)O)NC(=O)[C@H](CCCNC(=N)N)NC(=O)[C@H](C)NC(=O)[C@H](C)NC(=O)[C@H](CCC(=O)N)NC(=O)[C@](C)(CCCCNC(=O)CC[C@@H](C(=O)O)NC(=O)CCCCCCCCCCCCCCCCC(=O)O)NC(=O)[C@H](CC(=O)O)NC(=O)[C@H](CC(C)C)NC(=O)[C@H]([C@@H](C)CC)NC(=O)[C@H]([C@@H](C)O)NC(=O)[C@H](C)NC(=O)[C@H](CC(C)C)NC(=O)[C@H](CCC(=O)O)NC(=O)[C@H](CO)NC(=O)[C@H]([C@@H](C)O)NC(=O)[C@H](CC5=CC=CC=C5)NC(=O)[C@H](CO)NC(=O)CNC(=O)[C@H](CCC(=O)O)NC(=O)[C@H](C)NC(=O)[C@H](CC6=CNC=N6)N
- InChI: InChI=1S/C192H302N46O57/c1-24-101(11)151(181(284)211-108(18)161(264)219-133(84-115-90-203-120-60-49-48-59-118(115)120)172(275)221-130(81-100(9)10)175(278)233-152(102(12)25-2)182(285)218-124(65-70-140(195)244)167(270)224-134(86-117-92-200-97-206-117)173(276)216-121(61-50-52-76-193)169(272)231-154(104(14)27-4)184(287)237-156(111(21)242)185(288)228-137(189(293)294)89-150(259)260)232-176(279)131(82-113-55-42-40-43-56-113)222-174(277)135(87-148(255)256)225-166(269)122(62-54-78-202-191(197)198)214-159(262)106(16)207-158(261)105(15)209-165(268)126(66-71-141(196)245)230-190(295)192(23,75-51-53-77-201-142(246)72-67-127(188(291)292)212-143(247)63-46-38-36-34-32-30-28-29-31-33-35-37-39-47-64-145(249)250)238-180(283)136(88-149(257)258)226-171(274)129(80-99(7)8)227-183(286)153(103(13)26-3)234-187(290)157(112(22)243)235-162(265)109(19)210-170(273)128(79-98(5)6)220-168(271)125(69-74-147(253)254)217-179(282)139(95-240)229-186(289)155(110(20)241)236-177(280)132(83-114-57-44-41-45-58-114)223-178(281)138(94-239)213-144(248)93-204-164(267)123(68-73-146(251)252)215-160(263)107(17)208-163(266)119(194)85-116-91-199-96-205-116/h40-45,48-49,55-60,90-92,96-112,119,121-139,151-157,203,239-243H,24-39,46-47,50-54,61-89,93-95,193-194H2,1-23H3,(H2,195,244)(H2,196,245)(H,199,205)(H,200,206)(H,201,246)(H,204,267)(H,207,261)(H,208,266)(H,209,268)(H,210,273)(H,211,284)(H,212,247)(H,213,248)(H,214,262)(H,215,263)(H,216,276)(H,217,282)(H,218,285)(H,219,264)(H,220,271)(H,221,275)(H,222,277)(H,223,281)(H,224,270)(H,225,269)(H,226,274)(H,227,286)(H,228,288)(H,229,289)(H,230,295)(H,231,272)(H,232,279)(H,233,278)(H,234,290)(H,235,265)(H,236,280)(H,237,287)(H,238,283)(H,249,250)(H,251,252)(H,253,254)(H,255,256)(H,257,258)(H,259,260)(H,291,292)(H,293,294)(H4,197,198,202)/t101-,102-,103-,104-,105-,106-,107-,108-,109-,110+,111+,112+,119-,121-,122-,123-,124-,125-,126-,127-,128-,129-,130-,131-,132-,133-,134-,135-,136-,137-,138-,139-,151-,152-,153-,154-,155-,156-,157-,192-/m0/s1; Key:ZFSPELIJRGIIEX-HLQWLALHSA-N

Dapiglutide (formerly ZP 7570) is a dual GLP-1 and GLP-2 receptor agonist developed by Zealand Pharma. It is a peptide with a main chain of 33 amino acid residues.
