= Cotadutide =

Chemical compound

Clinical data
- Other names: MEDI-0382
- Routes of administration: Subcutaneous injection
- ATC code: None

Legal status
- Legal status: Investigational

Identifiers
- CAS Number: 1686108-82-6
- PubChem CID: 134694273
- DrugBank: DB15194
- ChemSpider: 75531286
- UNII: QL6A9B13HW
- KEGG: D11304

Chemical and physical data
- Formula: C_{167}H_{252}N_{42}O_{55}
- Molar mass: 3728.092 g·mol^{−1}
- 3D model (JSmol): Interactive image
- SMILES: CCCCCCCCCCCCCCCC(=O)N[C@@H](CCC(=O)NCCCC[C@@H](C(=O)N[C@@H](CO)C(=O)N[C@@H](CCC(=O)O)C(=O)N[C@@H](CC1=CC=C(C=C1)O)C(=O)N[C@@H](CC(C)C)C(=O)N[C@@H](CC(=O)O)C(=O)N[C@@H](CO)C(=O)N[C@@H](CCC(=O)O)C(=O)N[C@@H](CCCNC(=N)N)C(=O)N[C@@H](C)C(=O)N[C@@H](CCCNC(=N)N)C(=O)N[C@@H](CC(=O)O)C(=O)N[C@@H](CC2=CC=CC=C2)C(=O)N[C@@H](C(C)C)C(=O)N[C@@H](C)C(=O)N[C@@H](CC3=CNC4=CC=CC=C43)C(=O)N[C@@H](CC(C)C)C(=O)N[C@@H](CCC(=O)O)C(=O)N[C@@H](C)C(=O)NCC(=O)NCC(=O)O)NC(=O)[C@H](CC(=O)O)NC(=O)[C@H](CO)NC(=O)[C@H]([C@@H](C)O)NC(=O)[C@H](CC5=CC=CC=C5)NC(=O)[C@H]([C@@H](C)O)NC(=O)CNC(=O)[C@H](CCC(=O)N)NC(=O)[C@H](CO)NC(=O)[C@H](CC6=CNC=N6)N)C(=O)O
- InChI: InChI=1S/C167H252N42O55/c1-13-14-15-16-17-18-19-20-21-22-23-24-31-47-125(219)186-109(165(263)264)53-58-124(218)175-62-35-34-44-102(189-153(251)116(72-131(228)229)201-161(259)122(83-213)206-164(262)137(92(12)215)209-157(255)114(68-94-40-29-26-30-41-94)202-163(261)136(91(11)214)207-127(221)78-181-142(240)105(52-57-123(169)217)190-158(256)119(80-210)203-141(239)100(168)71-97-76-174-84-182-97)146(244)204-120(81-211)159(257)193-108(56-61-130(226)227)148(246)197-112(69-95-48-50-98(216)51-49-95)151(249)195-111(66-86(4)5)150(248)200-118(74-133(232)233)155(253)205-121(82-212)160(258)192-107(55-60-129(224)225)147(245)188-103(45-36-63-176-166(170)171)143(241)184-89(9)139(237)187-104(46-37-64-177-167(172)173)145(243)199-117(73-132(230)231)154(252)198-113(67-93-38-27-25-28-39-93)156(254)208-135(87(6)7)162(260)185-90(10)140(238)194-115(70-96-75-178-101-43-33-32-42-99(96)101)152(250)196-110(65-85(2)3)149(247)191-106(54-59-128(222)223)144(242)183-88(8)138(236)180-77-126(220)179-79-134(234)235/h25-30,32-33,38-43,48-51,75-76,84-92,100,102-122,135-137,178,210-216H,13-24,31,34-37,44-47,52-74,77-83,168H2,1-12H3,(H2,169,217)(H,174,182)(H,175,218)(H,179,220)(H,180,236)(H,181,240)(H,183,242)(H,184,241)(H,185,260)(H,186,219)(H,187,237)(H,188,245)(H,189,251)(H,190,256)(H,191,247)(H,192,258)(H,193,257)(H,194,238)(H,195,249)(H,196,250)(H,197,246)(H,198,252)(H,199,243)(H,200,248)(H,201,259)(H,202,261)(H,203,239)(H,204,244)(H,205,253)(H,206,262)(H,207,221)(H,208,254)(H,209,255)(H,222,223)(H,224,225)(H,226,227)(H,228,229)(H,230,231)(H,232,233)(H,234,235)(H,263,264)(H4,170,171,176)(H4,172,173,177)/t88-,89-,90-,91+,92+,100-,102-,103-,104-,105-,106-,107-,108-,109-,110-,111-,112-,113-,114-,115-,116-,117-,118-,119-,120-,121-,122-,135-,136-,137-/m0/s1; Key:YEKUUBPJRPXMBM-PTCFZACGSA-N

Cotadutide is an experimental drug for the treatment of type 2 diabetes mellitus. It lowers blood glucose levels by mimicking the human hormones glucagon-like peptide 1 and glucagon, which play a role in blood sugar regulation. The drug is a peptide that is injected under the skin.

Cotadutide is in Phase II clinical trials as of February 2021. Cotadutide, a therapeutic agent, was undergoing Phase II clinical trials. This stage of trials typically involves evaluating the drug's effectiveness and further assessing its safety in a larger group of participants, compared to earlier phases.

== See also ==
- Glucagon (medication)
