= Glucagon receptor agonist =

Class of drugs

Glucagon receptor agonists are a class of drugs under development for the treatment of obesity, non-alcoholic fatty liver disease, and congenital hyperinsulinism.

== Background ==
Glucagon is a hormone that generally opposes the action of insulin. It increases blood glucose by stimulating the production of glucose in the liver via glycogenolysis (breakdown of glycogen) and gluconeogenesis (production of glucose from non-carbohydrate sources). Glucagon also increases the breakdown of lipids and amino acids and the production of ketones. In healthy people, a low dose of exogenous glucagon increases energy expenditure and reduces energy intake without causing hyperglycemia. Glucagon is often elevated in type 2 diabetes; glucagon receptor antagonists were developed for the treatment of this disease but most were abandoned due to safety and adverse effects.

== Therapeutic uses ==
Rescue glucagon has been a preferred treatment for hypoglycemic shocks in insulin-dependent diabetes since the 1960s, but its use is limited by lack of stability. In the twenty-first century drug development has focused on making more stable versions, some of which do not require injection.

The glucagon receptor agonist HM15136 is in clinical trials for congenital hyperinsulinism.

Unlike currently approved weight loss drugs, glucagon receptor agonists increase energy expenditure.

=== Combination therapies ===
Combinations of glucagon with other incretin analogues such as GLP-1 receptor agonists and/or GIP receptor agonists is hoped to provide enhanced weight loss and metabolic improvements with fewer adverse effects. Combination GLP-1/glucagon receptor agonists provide the thermogenic benefits of glucagon activation while almost eliminating hyperglycemia induced by glucagon receptor activation. Several such drugs have reached human trials for obesity, diabetes, and non-alcoholic fatty liver disease but adverse effects have hampered development.

Glucagon is also a tissue-selective delivery mechanism for small molecule drugs. The glucagon-T3 conjugate in mice delivers significant metabolic benefits with less toxicity than glucagon or T3.

== Adverse effects ==
Hyperglycemia is one of the major adverse effects associated with glucagon receptor activation. Although glucagon receptors are densest in the liver, they also appear in other organs including the heart. Glucagon receptor agonists can increase heart rate, although cardiac risks may be mitigated by more tissue selective agonists with a preference for the liver.
