= TG103 =

Experimental drug

TG103 is an experimental GLP-1 receptor agonist and Fc fusion protein combination, developed by CSPC Pharmaceutical Group.
