= Aleniglipron =

Chemical compound

Legal status
- Legal status: Investigational

Identifiers
- IUPAC name: 3-[(1S,2S)-1-[2-[[(4S)-3-[3-[4-(Diethylphosphinyl)-3-(methylamino)phenyl]-2,3-dihydro-2-oxo-1H-imidazol-1-yl]-2-(4-fluoro-3,5-dimethylphenyl)-2,4,6,7-tetrahydro-4-methyl-5H-pyrazolo[4,3-c]pyridin-5-yl]carbonyl]-5-(tetrahydro-2H-pyran-4-yl)-1H-indol-1-yl]-2-methylcyclopropyl]-1,2,4-oxadiazol-5(2H)-one
- CAS Number: 2685823-26-9
- PubChem CID: 164809721
- DrugBank: DB18551
- UNII: Z6XCL6R9SX
- KEGG: D13248

Chemical and physical data
- Formula: C_{49}H_{55}FN_{9}O_{6}P
- Molar mass: 916.008 g·mol^{−1}
- InChI: InChI=1S/C49H55FN9O6P/c1-8-66(63,9-2)41-13-11-35(26-38(41)51-7)56-18-19-57(48(56)62)44-42-31(6)55(17-14-37(42)53-59(44)36-22-28(3)43(50)29(4)23-36)45(60)40-25-34-24-33(32-15-20-64-21-16-32)10-12-39(34)58(40)49(27-30(49)5)46-52-47(61)65-54-46/h10-13,18-19,22-26,30-32,51H,8-9,14-17,20-21,27H2,1-7H3,(H,52,54,61)/t30-,31-,49-/m0/s1; Key:CPOJUYUGONJVPZ-WIXASUBBSA-N

Aleniglipron (development code GSBR-1290) is a small-molecule GLP-1 agonist developed by Structure Therapeutics. It is delivered orally and is in a Phase II trial as of 2023. In June 2024, Structure Therapeutics reported positive topline data from a Phase 2a obesity study in which GSBR-1290 demonstrated clinically meaningful and statistically significant placebo-adjusted mean weight loss and generally favorable safety and tolerability results.
