= HEC88473 =

Experimental drug

HEC88473 is an experimental dual GLP-1 and fibroblast growth factor 21 (FGF21) receptor agonist. It is developed by the Chinese company HEC Pharm for diabetes and non-alcoholic steatohepatitis.
