= K cell =

K cell may refer to:

- k-cell (mathematics)
- K cells intestinal cells
- Natural killer cell
- Koniocellular cell
- Knudsen cell
- The unit cube of dimension k
- Kcell, a Kazakhstani mobile phone operator
