= Zenagamtide =

GLP-1 receptor agonist and amylin receptor agonist

Clinical data
- Other names: NN 9487; NN9487; NNC0487-0111

Identifiers
- CAS Number: 3051672-09-1

Amycretin/Zenagamtide (development code NN 9487) is a single molecule that operates as a GLP-1 receptor agonist and amylin receptor agonist. It is under development by Novo Nordisk as a weight loss drug; unlike some competitors, it can be delivered orally. A subcutaneous injection formulation is being developed in parallel.

The drug's dual mechanism of action, which affects appetite regulation (through the GLP-1 receptor) and metabolism (through the amylin receptor), distinguishes it from existing weight loss medications. It contains two covalently linked peptides that are analogs of GLP-1 and amylin respectively. The oral formulation contains salcaprozate sodium (sodium N-[8-(2-hydroxybenzoyl) amino] caprylate; SNAC) as a permeation enhancer.

== Clinical trials ==
On 7 March 2024, the company announced the results from the Phase I trial of the pill form of amycretin.

In January 2025, the company announced the results of its 1B/2A trial. The trial investigated safety, tolerability, and pharmacokinetics following weekly subcutaneous administration in 125 patients. Treatment duration was up to 36 weeks.

Novo Nordisk Chief Executive Lars Fruergaard Jørgensen forecast the roll-out of amycretin to be largely injectable medicines at first with oral versions being introduced later in higher-priced markets.
