= NNC9204-1706 =

Experimental drug

NNC9204-1706 or NN9423 is a GLP-1/GIP/glucagon receptor triple agonist developed by Novo Nordisk. It was evaluated in a clinical trial; adverse effects such as "dose-dependent increases in heart rate and reductions in reticulocyte count, increases in markers of inflammation and hepatic disturbances, and impaired glucose tolerance at the highest dosages" meant that the drug was declared to have an inadequate safety profile and discontinued.
