= Mazdutide =

GLP1 poly-agonist drug

Clinical data
- Other names: IBI362; LY3305677
- Routes of administration: Injection

Legal status
- Legal status: Rx in China, Investigational in general

Identifiers
- IUPAC name: 20-[[(1S)-4-[2-[2-[2-[2-[2-[2-[[(5S)-5-[[(2S)-2-[[(2S)-6-amino-2-[[(2S)-6-amino-2-[[(2S)-2-[[(2S)-2-[[(2S)-2-[[(2S)-2-[[(2S)-6-amino-2-[[(2S)-2-[[(2S)-2-[[(2S)-2-[[(2S)-2-[[(2S,3R)-2-[[(2S)-2-[[(2S,3R)-2-[[2-[[(2S)-5-amino-2-[[2-[[(2S)-2-amino-3-(1H-imidazol-4-yl)propanoyl]amino]-2-methylpropanoyl]amino]-5-oxopentanoyl]amino]acetyl]amino]-3-hydroxybutanoyl]amino]-3-phenylpropanoyl]amino]-3-hydroxybutanoyl]amino]-3-hydroxypropanoyl]amino]-3-carboxypropanoyl]amino]-3-(4-hydroxyphenyl)propanoyl]amino]-3-hydroxypropanoyl]amino]hexanoyl]amino]-3-(4-hydroxyphenyl)propanoyl]amino]-4-methylpentanoyl]amino]-3-carboxypropanoyl]amino]-4-carboxybutanoyl]amino]hexanoyl]amino]hexanoyl]amino]propanoyl]amino]-6-[[(2S)-1-[[(2S)-1-[[(2S)-1-[[(2S)-1-[[(2S)-1-[[(2S)-1-[[(2S)-1-[[(2S)-1-[[2-[[2-[(2S)-2-[[(2S)-1-[(2-amino-2-oxoethyl)amino]-3-hydroxy-1-oxopropan-2-yl]carbamoyl]pyrrolidin-1-yl]-2-oxoethyl]amino]-2-oxoethyl]amino]-4-carboxy-1-oxobutan-2-yl]amino]-4-methyl-1-oxopentan-2-yl]amino]-4-methyl-1-oxopentan-2-yl]amino]-3-(1H-indol-3-yl)-1-oxopropan-2-yl]amino]-4-carboxy-1-oxobutan-2-yl]amino]-3-methyl-1-oxobutan-2-yl]amino]-1-oxo-3-phenylpropan-2-yl]amino]-4-carboxy-1-oxobutan-2-yl]amino]-6-oxohexyl]amino]-2-oxoethoxy]ethoxy]ethylamino]-2-oxoethoxy]ethoxy]ethylamino]-1-carboxy-4-oxobutyl]amino]-20-oxoicosanoic acid
- CAS Number: 2259884-03-0
- PubChem CID: 167312357
- DrugBank: DB19099
- ChemSpider: 129341158
- UNII: MB76Z4IBZ5

Chemical and physical data
- Formula: C_{210}H_{322}N_{46}O_{67}
- Molar mass: 4563.141 g·mol^{−1}
- SMILES: CC(C)C[C@H](NC(=O)[C@H](CC(C)C)NC(=O)[C@H](Cc1c[nH]c2ccccc12)NC(=O)[C@H](CCC(=O)O)NC(=O)[C@@H](NC(=O)[C@H](Cc1ccccc1)NC(=O)[C@H](CCC(=O)O)NC(=O)[C@H](CCCCNC(=O)COCCOCCNC(=O)COCCOCCNC(=O)CC[C@H](NC(=O)CCCCCCCCCCCCCCCCCCC(=O)O)C(=O)O)NC(=O)[C@H](C)NC(=O)[C@H](CCCCN)NC(=O)[C@H](CCCCN)NC(=O)[C@H](CCC(=O)O)NC(=O)[C@H](CC(=O)O)NC(=O)[C@H](CC(C)C)NC(=O)[C@H](Cc1ccc(O)cc1)NC(=O)[C@H](CCCCN)NC(=O)[C@H](CO)NC(=O)[C@H](Cc1ccc(O)cc1)NC(=O)[C@H](CC(=O)O)NC(=O)[C@H](CO)NC(=O)[C@@H](NC(=O)[C@H](Cc1ccccc1)NC(=O)[C@@H](NC(=O)CNC(=O)[C@H](CCC(N)=O)NC(=O)C(C)(C)NC(=O)[C@@H](N)Cc1c[nH]cn1)[C@@H](C)O)[C@@H](C)O)C(C)C)C(=O)N[C@@H](CCC(=O)O)C(=O)NCC(=O)NCC(=O)N1CCC[C@H]1C(=O)N[C@@H](CO)C(=O)N[C@@H](CO)C(=O)NCC(N)=O
- InChI: InChI=1S/C210H322N46O67/c1-117(2)93-145(191(300)233-139(70-76-170(276)277)181(290)224-107-164(269)222-109-168(273)256-86-46-57-159(256)204(313)249-157(112-259)203(312)247-155(110-257)183(292)223-106-161(216)266)237-192(301)146(94-118(3)4)239-196(305)152(100-128-104-221-134-52-37-36-51-132(128)134)243-190(299)143(73-79-173(282)283)236-205(314)176(120(7)8)253-199(308)150(96-124-47-30-28-31-48-124)241-189(298)142(72-78-172(280)281)234-185(294)136(56-41-45-83-218-166(271)114-322-91-90-321-88-85-220-167(272)115-323-92-89-320-87-84-219-162(267)75-69-144(208(317)318)228-163(268)58-34-26-24-22-20-18-16-14-15-17-19-21-23-25-27-35-59-169(274)275)229-179(288)121(9)227-184(293)135(53-38-42-80-211)230-186(295)137(54-39-43-81-212)231-188(297)141(71-77-171(278)279)235-197(306)153(102-174(284)285)244-193(302)147(95-119(5)6)238-194(303)148(98-126-60-64-130(263)65-61-126)240-187(296)138(55-40-44-82-213)232-201(310)156(111-258)248-195(304)149(99-127-62-66-131(264)67-63-127)242-198(307)154(103-175(286)287)245-202(311)158(113-260)250-207(316)178(123(11)262)254-200(309)151(97-125-49-32-29-33-50-125)246-206(315)177(122(10)261)252-165(270)108-225-182(291)140(68-74-160(215)265)251-209(319)210(12,13)255-180(289)133(214)101-129-105-217-116-226-129/h28-33,36-37,47-52,60-67,104-105,116-123,133,135-159,176-178,221,257-264H,14-27,34-35,38-46,53-59,68-103,106-115,211-214H2,1-13H3,(H2,215,265)(H2,216,266)(H,217,226)(H,218,271)(H,219,267)(H,220,272)(H,222,269)(H,223,292)(H,224,290)(H,225,291)(H,227,293)(H,228,268)(H,229,288)(H,230,295)(H,231,297)(H,232,310)(H,233,300)(H,234,294)(H,235,306)(H,236,314)(H,237,301)(H,238,303)(H,239,305)(H,240,296)(H,241,298)(H,242,307)(H,243,299)(H,244,302)(H,245,311)(H,246,315)(H,247,312)(H,248,304)(H,249,313)(H,250,316)(H,251,319)(H,252,270)(H,253,308)(H,254,309)(H,255,289)(H,274,275)(H,276,277)(H,278,279)(H,280,281)(H,282,283)(H,284,285)(H,286,287)(H,317,318)/t121-,122+,123+,133-,135-,136-,137-,138-,139-,140-,141-,142-,143-,144-,145-,146-,147-,148-,149-,150-,151-,152-,153-,154-,155-,156-,157-,158-,159-,176-,177-,178-/m0/s1; Key:NCZIWZAVWHEUKM-SQZAUUIPSA-N

Mazdutide (also known as IBI362 or LY3305677) is a dual agonist of the GLP-1 receptor and glucagon receptor. It is an analog of oxyntomodulin (OXM). The drug is developed by Eli Lilly and Innovent Biologics. and is currently in multiple Phase III studies. In May 2025, a result of Phase III study has shown that once-weekly mazdutide led to clinically relevant reductions in body weight in Chinese adults with overweight or obesity.

In June 2025, Mazdutide injection is approved for marketing in China.
