= Tirzepatide =

Anti-diabetic and anti-obesity medication

- Top: Tirzepatide molecular structure Bottom: Structure using peptide three-letter code

Clinical data
- Pronunciation: /tɜːrˈzɛpətaɪd/ tur-ZEP-ə-tyde
- Trade names: Mounjaro, Zepbound
- Other names: LY3298176
- AHFS/Drugs.com: Monograph
- MedlinePlus: a622044
- License data: US DailyMed: Tirzepatide
- Pregnancy category: AU: D
- Routes of administration: Subcutaneous
- Drug class: Antidiabetic, GLP-1 receptor agonist
- ATC code: A10BX16 (WHO)

Legal status
- Legal status: AU: S4 (Prescription only); CA: ℞-only; UK: POM (Prescription only); US: ℞-only; EU: Rx-only

Pharmacokinetic data
- Bioavailability: 80%
- Protein binding: Albumin
- Metabolism: Proteolytic cleavage, β-oxidation of fatty diacid section and amide hydrolysis
- Elimination half-life: 5 days
- Excretion: Urine and feces

Identifiers
- IUPAC name: (2S)-2-[[20-[[(5S)-6-[[(2S,3S)-1-[[(2S)-1-[[(2S)-5-amino-1-[[(2S)-6-amino-1-[[(2S)-1-[[(2S)-1-[[(2S)-1-[[(2S)-5-amino-1-[[(2S)-1-[[(2S)-1-[[(2S,3S)-1-[[(2S)-1-[[2-[[2-[(2S)-2-[[(2S)-1-[[(2S)-1-[[2-[[(2S)-1-[(2S)-2-[(2S)-2-[(2S)-2-[[(2S)-1-amino-3-hydroxy-1-oxopropan-2-yl]carbamoyl]pyrrolidine-1-carbonyl]pyrrolidine-1-carbonyl]pyrrolidin-1-yl]-1-oxopropan-2-yl]amino]-2-oxoethyl]amino]-3-hydroxy-1-oxopropan-2-yl]amino]-3-hydroxy-1-oxopropan-2-yl]carbamoyl]pyrrolidin-1-yl]-2-oxoethyl]amino]-2-oxoethyl]amino]-1-oxopropan-2-yl]amino]-3-methyl-1-oxopentan-2-yl]amino]-4-methyl-1-oxopentan-2-yl]amino]-3-(1H-indol-3-yl)-1-oxopropan-2-yl]amino]-1,5-dioxopentan-2-yl]amino]-3-methyl-1-oxobutan-2-yl]amino]-1-oxo-3-phenylpropan-2-yl]amino]-1-oxopropan-2-yl]amino]-1-oxohexan-2-yl]amino]-1,5-dioxopentan-2-yl]amino]-1-oxopropan-2-yl]amino]-3-methyl-1-oxopentan-2-yl]amino]-5-[[(2S)-2-[[(2S)-2-[[2-[[(2S,3S)-2-[[(2S)-2-[[(2S)-2-[[(2S)-2-[[(2S)-2-[[(2S,3R)-2-[[(2S)-2-[[(2S,3R)-2-[[2-[[(2S)-2-[[2-[[(2S)-2-amino-3-(4-hydroxyphenyl)propanoyl]amino]-2-methylpropanoyl]amino]-4-carboxybutanoyl]amino]acetyl]amino]-3-hydroxybutanoyl]amino]-3-phenylpropanoyl]amino]-3-hydroxybutanoyl]amino]-3-hydroxypropanoyl]amino]-3-carboxypropanoyl]amino]-3-(4-hydroxyphenyl)propanoyl]amino]-3-hydroxypropanoyl]amino]-3-methylpentanoyl]amino]-2-methylpropanoyl]amino]-4-methylpentanoyl]amino]-3-carboxypropanoyl]amino]-6-oxohexyl]amino]-20-oxoicosanoyl]amino]-5-[2-[2-[2-[2-[2-(carboxymethoxy)ethoxy]ethylamino]-2-oxoethoxy]ethoxy]ethylamino]-5-oxopentanoic acid
- CAS Number: 2023788-19-2
- PubChem CID: 166567236
- IUPHAR/BPS: 11429
- DrugBank: DB15171
- ChemSpider: 76714503
- UNII: OYN3CCI6QE
- KEGG: D11360
- ChEBI: CHEBI:194186
- ChEMBL: ChEMBL4297839
- ECHA InfoCard: 100.369.612

Chemical and physical data
- Formula: C_{225}H_{348}N_{48}O_{68}
- Molar mass: 4813.527 g·mol^{−1}
- SMILES: CC[C@H](C)[C@H](N=C(O)[C@H](CC(C)C)N=C(O)[C@H](Cc1c[nH]c2ccccc12)N=C(O)[C@H](CCC(=N)O)N=C(O)[C@@H](N=C(O)[C@H](Cc1ccccc1)N=C(O)[C@H](C)N=C(O)[C@H](CCCCN=C(O)COCCOCCN=C(O)COCCOCCN=C(O)CC[C@H](N=C(O)CCCCCCCCCCCCCCCCCCC(=O)O)C(=O)O)N=C(O)[C@H](CCC(=N)O)N=C(O)[C@H](C)N=C(O)[C@@H](N=C(O)[C@H](CCCCN)N=C(O)[C@H](CC(=O)O)N=C(O)[C@H](CC(C)C)N=C(O)C(C)(C)N=C(O)[C@@H](N=C(O)[C@H](CO)N=C(O)[C@H](Cc1ccc(O)cc1)N=C(O)[C@H](CC(=O)O)N=C(O)[C@H](CO)N=C(O)[C@@H](N=C(O)[C@H](Cc1ccccc1)N=C(O)[C@@H](N=C(O)CN=C(O)[C@H](CCC(=O)O)N=C(O)C(C)(C)N=C(O)[C@@H](N)Cc1ccc(O)cc1)[C@@H](C)O)[C@@H](C)O)[C@@H](C)CC)[C@@H](C)CC)C(C)C)C(O)=N[C@@H](C)C(O)=NCC(O)=NCC(=O)N1CCC[C@H]1C(O)=N[C@@H](CO)C(O)=N[C@@H](CO)C(O)=NCC(O)=N[C@@H](C)C(=O)N1CCC[C@H]1C(=O)N1CCC[C@H]1C(=O)N1CCC[C@H]1C(O)=N[C@@H](CO)C(=N)O
- InChI: InChI=1S/C225H348N48O68/c1-23-126(10)183(264-198(311)146(64-50-52-88-226)246-202(315)157(109-180(297)298)252-199(312)152(103-124(6)7)261-223(337)225(21,22)269-217(330)185(128(12)25-3)266-209(322)163(120-278)257-200(313)153(107-138-74-78-141(282)79-75-138)250-203(316)158(110-181(299)300)253-207(320)162(119-277)259-216(329)187(134(18)280)267-206(319)155(106-136-60-44-41-45-61-136)254-215(328)186(133(17)279)262-174(289)114-237-193(306)147(83-87-179(295)296)260-222(336)224(19,20)268-192(305)143(227)104-137-72-76-140(281)77-73-137)214(327)242-131(15)190(303)244-148(80-84-168(228)283)196(309)245-145(65-51-53-89-231-175(290)121-340-100-99-339-97-91-233-176(291)122-341-101-98-338-96-90-232-170(285)86-82-150(221(334)335)243-171(286)70-46-38-36-34-32-30-28-26-27-29-31-33-35-37-39-47-71-178(293)294)195(308)240-130(14)191(304)248-154(105-135-58-42-40-43-59-135)205(318)263-182(125(8)9)212(325)247-149(81-85-169(229)284)197(310)251-156(108-139-111-234-144-63-49-48-62-142(139)144)201(314)249-151(102-123(4)5)204(317)265-184(127(11)24-2)213(326)241-129(13)189(302)236-112-172(287)235-115-177(292)270-92-54-66-164(270)210(323)258-161(118-276)208(321)256-160(117-275)194(307)238-113-173(288)239-132(16)218(331)272-94-56-68-166(272)220(333)273-95-57-69-167(273)219(332)271-93-55-67-165(271)211(324)255-159(116-274)188(230)301/h40-45,48-49,58-63,72-79,111,123-134,143,145-167,182-187,234,274-282H,23-39,46-47,50-57,64-71,80-110,112-122,226-227H2,1-22H3,(H2,228,283)(H2,229,284)(H2,230,301)(H,231,290)(H,232,285)(H,233,291)(H,235,287)(H,236,302)(H,237,306)(H,238,307)(H,239,288)(H,240,308)(H,241,326)(H,242,327)(H,243,286)(H,244,303)(H,245,309)(H,246,315)(H,247,325)(H,248,304)(H,249,314)(H,250,316)(H,251,310)(H,252,312)(H,253,320)(H,254,328)(H,255,324)(H,256,321)(H,257,313)(H,258,323)(H,259,329)(H,260,336)(H,261,337)(H,262,289)(H,263,318)(H,264,311)(H,265,317)(H,266,322)(H,267,319)(H,268,305)(H,269,330)(H,293,294)(H,295,296)(H,297,298)(H,299,300)(H,334,335)/t126-,127-,128-,129-,130-,131-,132-,133+,134+,143-,145-,146-,147-,148-,149-,150-,151-,152-,153-,154-,155-,156-,157-,158-,159-,160-,161-,162-,163-,164-,165-,166-,167-,182-,183-,184-,185-,186-,187-/m0/s1 From Pubchem; Key:BTSOGEDATSQOAF-MCNPHUAVSA-N

Tirzepatide is a gastric inhibitory polypeptide (GIP) analog and a GLP-1 receptor agonist. It is used as an antidiabetic medication to treat type 2 diabetes (T2D) and for weight loss. Tirzepatide is administered via subcutaneous injections (under the skin). It is sold in several countries under the brand name Mounjaro for T2D treatment. In the United States and Canada, it is sold under the brand name Zepbound for weight loss and for the treatment of obstructive sleep apnea.

The most common side effects of tirzepatide include nausea, vomiting, diarrhea, decreased appetite, constipation, upper abdominal discomfort, and abdominal pain. In 2023, tirzepatide was the 110th-most commonly prescribed medication in the United States, with more than 6 million prescriptions.

== Medical uses ==
Tirzepatide (as Mounjaro) is indicated as an adjunct to diet and exercise to improve glycemic control in adults with type 2 diabetes.

Tirzepatide (as Zepbound) is indicated, alongside a reduced-calorie diet and increased physical activity, for long-term weight reduction in adults with obesity or overweight with at least one weight-related comorbidity. Zepbound is also approved for the treatment of moderate-to-severe obstructive sleep apnea in adults with obesity.

Research on weight regain following discontinuation of tirzepatide for obesity found that participants regained an average of 53% of their lost weight within one year. A subsequent meta-analysis projected that average body weight could return to pretreatment levels approximately 1.5 years after discontinuation of newer weight-management medications, including tirzepatide and semaglutide, although follow-up data beyond one year were unavailable for these medications.

== Contraindications ==
Tirzepatide is contraindicated for use in people with a personal or family history of medullary thyroid cancer and people with multiple endocrine neoplasia type 2.

== Adverse effects ==
Preclinical, phase I, and phase II clinical trials indicated that tirzepatide exhibits adverse effects similar to those of other established GLP-1 receptor agonists, such as dulaglutide (sold as Trulicity) and semaglutide (sold as Wegovy, Ozempic, and Rybelsus). These effects occur largely in the gastrointestinal tract. In the phase-II randomized controlled trial of tirzepatide for type 2 diabetes published in The Lancet in 2018, the most frequently observed symptoms were nausea, diarrhea, and vomiting, which increase in incidence as dosage increases. The proportion of patients who discontinued taking tirzepatide also increased as the dosage increased, with patients taking 15 mg having a 25% discontinuation rate and 5.1% of those taking 5 mg. To a slightly lesser extent, patients also reported reduced appetite. Other side effects reported were dyspepsia, constipation, abdominal pain, dizziness, and hypoglycemia.

A systematic review published in 2024 found that tirzepatide was well tolerated and not associated with pancreatitis, but later case reports have found that pancreatitis sometimes follows initiation of treatment with tirzepatide. In 2026, the UK Medicines and Healthcare products Regulatory Agency (MHRA) updated its guidance on GLP-1 medications after an increase in reports to the agency's Yellow Card Scheme of acute pancreatitis, with fatalities, in patients taking semaglutide or tirzepatide, to warn of a small risk of developing severe acute pancreatitis.

It has been suggested that suicidal behavior and ideation may be associated with use of GLP-1 receptor-agonist medication, but studies in several countries since 2024 do not support this. In January 2026, the US Food and Drug Administration requested removal of a suicidal behavior and ideation warning from GLP-1 receptor-agonist medications.

== Pharmacology ==
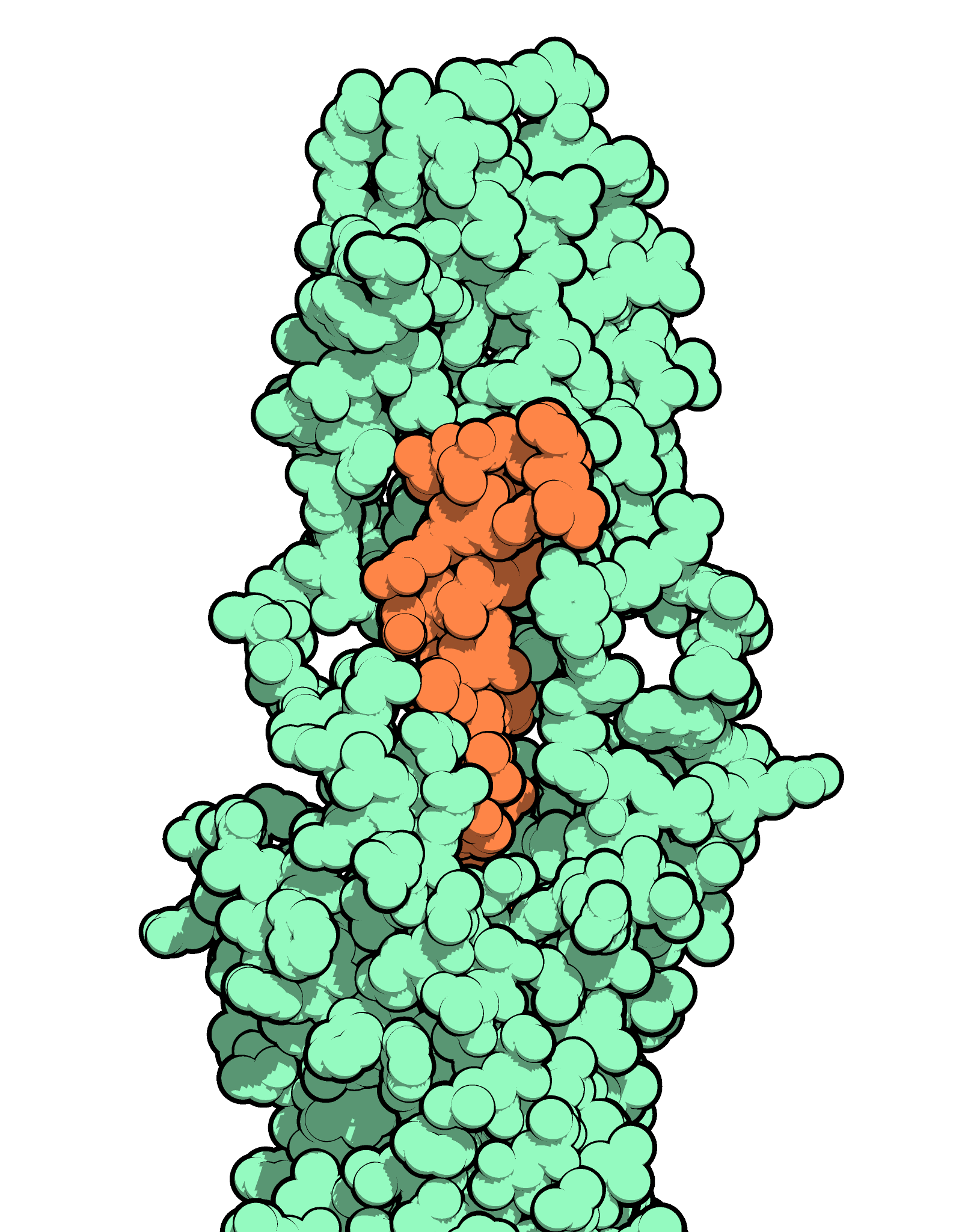
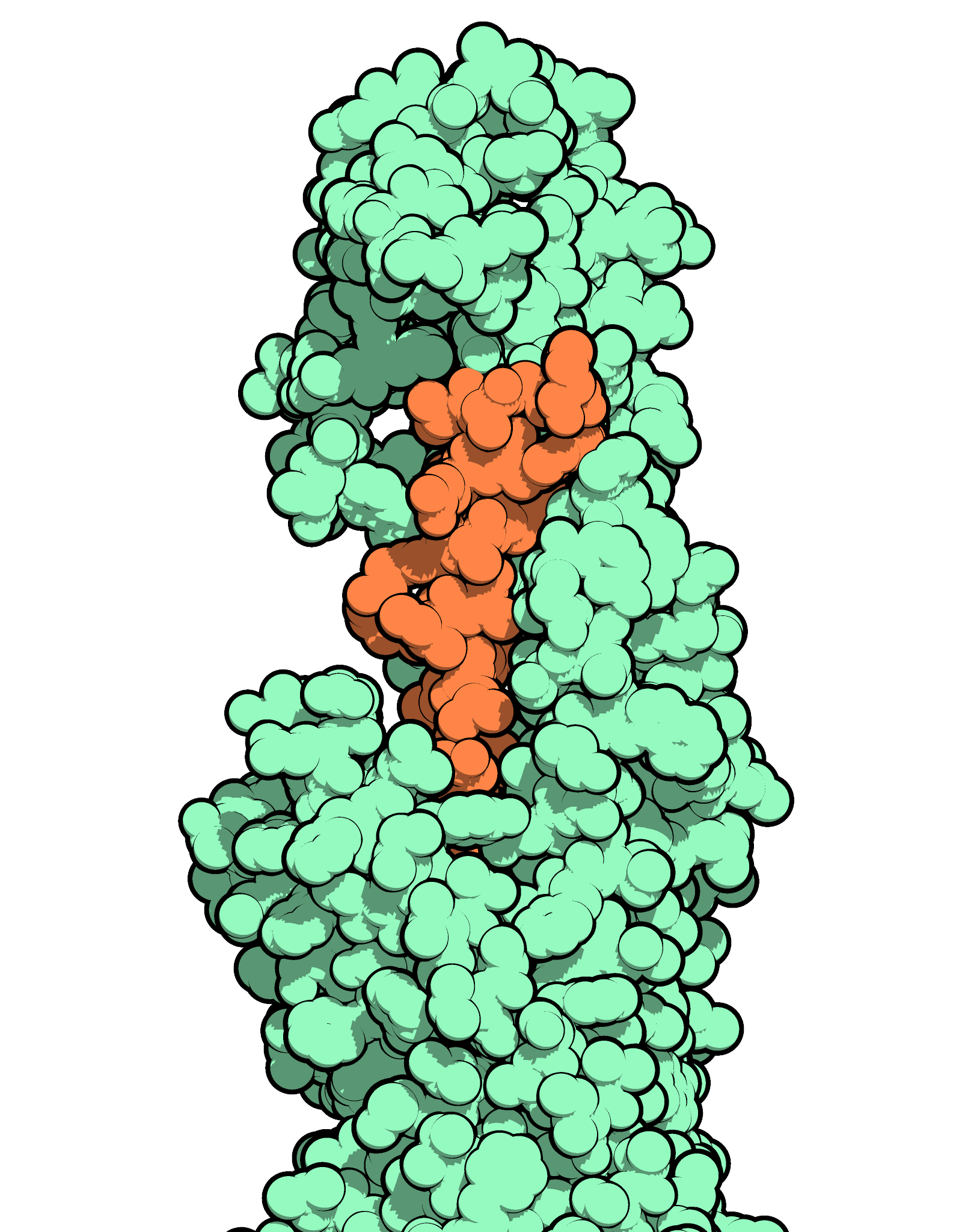
Space-filling models of tirzepatide (orange) in complex with the GIP receptor (left) and the GLP-1 receptor (right)

Tirzepatide is an analog of gastric inhibitory polypeptide (GIP), a human hormone that stimulates the release of insulin from the pancreas. Tirzepatide is a linear polypeptide of 39 amino acids that has been chemically modified by lipidation to improve its uptake into cells and its stability to metabolism. It completed phase III trials globally in 2021.

=== Mechanism of action ===
Tirzepatide has a greater affinity to GIP receptors than to GLP-1 receptors, and this dual agonist behavior has been shown to produce greater reductions of hyperglycemia compared to a selective GLP-1 receptor agonist.

Signaling studies reported that tirzepatide mimics the actions of natural GIP at the GIP receptor. At the GLP-1 receptor, though, tirzepatide shows bias toward cAMP (a messenger associated with regulation of glycogen, sugar, and lipid metabolism) generation rather than β-arrestin recruitment. This combination of preference toward GIP receptor and distinct signaling properties at GLP-1 suggest this biased agonism increases insulin secretion.

Tirzepatide has been reported to increase levels of adiponectin, an adipokine involved in the regulation of both glucose and lipid metabolism, with a maximum increase of 26% from baseline after 26 weeks, at the 10 mg dosage.

== Chemistry ==
=== Structure ===
Tirzepatide is an analog of the human GIP hormone with a C_{20} fatty diacid portion attached, used to optimise the uptake and metabolism of the compound. The fatty-diacid section (eicosanedioic acid) is linked via a glutamic acid and two (2-(2-aminoethoxy)ethoxy)acetic acid units to the side chain of the lysine residue. This arrangement allows for a much longer half-life, extending the time between doses, because of its high affinity to albumin.

=== Synthesis ===
The synthesis of tirzepatide was first disclosed in patents filed by Eli Lilly and Company in 2016. This uses standard solid phase peptide synthesis, with an allyloxycarbonyl protecting group on the lysine at position 20 of the linear chain of amino acids, allowing a final set of chemical transformations in which the sidechain amine of that lysine is derivatized with the lipid-containing fragment.

Large-scale manufacturing processes have been reported for this compound.

== History ==
Eli Lilly and Company first applied for a patent for a method of glycemic control using tirzepatide in 2016. After passing phase III clinical trials, Eli Lilly applied to the US Food and Drug Administration (FDA) for approval in 2021, with a priority review voucher.

After completing the SURPASS-2 trial (NCT03987919), the company announced in April 2022 that tirzepatide had successfully met its clinical endpoints in obese and overweight participants without diabetes.

In industry-funded preliminary trials, tirzepatide showed minor improvement of reductions (2.01–2.30% depending on dosage) in glycated hemoglobin tests relative to the injected GLP-1 analog semaglutide (1.86%). A 10 mg dose has been shown to be effective in reducing insulin resistance, with a reduction of around 8% from baseline, measured using HOMA2-IR (computed with fasting insulin). Fasting levels of insulin-like growth factor (IGF) binding proteins such as IGFBP1 and IGFBP2 increased after tirzepatide treatment, increasing insulin sensitivity.

A 2021 meta-analysis found that over 1 year of clinical use, tirzepatide was superior to dulaglutide, semaglutide, insulin degludec, and insulin glargine in improving blood sugar control and reducing body weight.

In a phase III double-blind, randomized, controlled trial supported by Eli Lilly, nondiabetic adults with a body mass index of 30 or more, or 27 or more and at least one weight-related complication, excluding diabetes, were randomized to receive once-weekly, subcutaneous tirzepatide (5, 10, or 15 mg) or placebo. The mean percentage change in weight at week 72 was −15.0% (95% confidence interval [CI], −15.9 to −14.2) with 5-mg weekly doses of tirzepatide, −19.5% (95% CI, −20.4 to −18.5) with 10-mg doses, and −20.9% (95% CI, −21.8 to −19.9) with 15-mg doses. Weight change in the placebo group was −3.1% (95% CI, −4.3 to −1.9).

The FDA approved tirzepatide based on evidence from nine clinical trials of 7,769 participants with type 2 diabetes, of whom 5,415 received tirzepatide. The trials were conducted at 673 sites in 24 countries, including Argentina, Australia, Brazil, Canada, India, Israel, Japan, Mexico, Russian Federation, South Korea, Taiwan, European Union, and the United States (including Puerto Rico). All nine trials were used to assess its safety, and five were used to evaluate its efficacy. The five used in efficacy evaluation included 6,263 adult participants with type 2 diabetes. Four additional trials (NCT03131687, NCT03311724, NCT03861052, and NCT03861039) were included in the safety evaluation, for a total of 7,769 adult participants with type 2 diabetes; therefore, the number of participants representing efficacy findings may differ from the number representing safety findings due to different pools of study participants analyzed for efficacy and safety. Tirzepatide's benefits for the treatment of adult participants with type 2 diabetes were primarily evaluated in five clinical trials. In two of these (NCT03954834 and NCT04039503), participants were randomly assigned to receive either tirzepatide or placebo injection weekly. Neither the patient nor the healthcare provider knew which treatment was being given until after the trials. Treatment was given for 40 weeks. In the other three trials (NCT3987919, NCT03882970, and NCT03730662), participants were randomly assigned to receive either tirzepatide or another antidiabetic medication, and both the patient and the provider knew which medication was being given. Treatment was given for 40 weeks to 104 weeks. In each trial, HbA1c was measured from the start to the end of the trial and compared between the tirzepatide group and the other groups.

Tirzepatide's efficacy for chronic weight management (weight reduction and maintenance) in combination with a reduced-calorie diet and increased physical activity was established in two randomized, double-blind, placebo-controlled trials in adults with obesity or overweight who had at least one weight-related condition. These studies measured weight reduction after 72 weeks in 2,519 participants who received either 5, 10, or 15 mg of tirzepatide once weekly and 958 participants who received weekly placebo injections. In both trials, after 72 weeks of treatment, participants who received tirzepatide at all three dose levels experienced a statistically significant reduction in body weight compared to those who received placebo, and greater proportions of participants who received tirzepatide achieved at least 5% weight reduction compared to placebo.

In August 2024, the SURMOUNT-1 three-year study (176-week treatment period) found that tirzepatide reduced the risk of developing type 2 diabetes by 94% in adults with pre-diabetes and obesity or overweight.

== Society and culture ==
=== Legal status ===
The US Food and Drug Administration (FDA) granted the application for tirzepatide priority review designation. Mounjaro was approved for medical use in the US in 2022.

In July 2022, the Committee for Medicinal Products for Human Use of the European Medicines Agency adopted a positive opinion, recommending granting a marketing authorization for the medicinal product Mounjaro, intended for the treatment of type 2 diabetes. Tirzepatide was approved for medical use in the European Union in September 2022.

In December 2024, the FDA approved tirzepatide (Zepbound) as the first medication to be used in the treatment of moderate to severe obstructive sleep apnea. The FDA granted the application for tirzepatide (Zepbound) fast track, priority review, and breakthrough therapy designations for the treatment of moderate to severe obstructive sleep apnea. The FDA granted the approval of Zepbound to Eli Lilly.

Tirzepatide was approved for treatment of type 2 diabetes in the US in May 2022, in the European Union in September 2022, in Canada in November 2022, and in Australia in December 2022. The FDA considers it a first-in-class medication.

The FDA approved it for weight loss in November 2023. Also in November 2023, the UK Medicines and Healthcare products Regulatory Agency revised the indication for tirzepatide (as Mounjaro) to include weight management and weight loss.

In December 2024, the FDA revised the indication for tirzepatide (as Zepbound) to include the treatment of moderate-to-severe obstructive sleep apnea.

=== Names ===
Tirzepatide is the international nonproprietary name.

Tirzepatide is sold under the brand names Mounjaro and Zepbound.

=== Shortage ===
In the US, some compounding pharmacies prepare compounded versions of a drug on the FDA's drug shortages list if the compounded drug meets certain conditions detailed in federal law. The US Food and Drug Administration (FDA) declared a shortage of tirzepatide in December 2022. It declared the shortage over in October 2024, but enforcement was delayed until the end of 2024, after a lawsuit by compounding pharmacies challenged the declaration.

The US National Association of Boards of Pharmacy says there are tens of thousands of online pharmacies operating out of compliance with state and federal regulations or the association's recommendations. The FDA has not evaluated these for safety and effectiveness and they are thus considered not to have been shown to be safe or effective.

=== CHIP, Medicaid, and Medicare Coverage ===
In April 2025, the Trump Administration declined to finalize a Biden Administration proposal that would have required Medicare, Medicaid, and the Children's Health Insurance Program (CHIP) to broadly cover GLP-1 drugs for weight loss.

In November 2025, the Trump Administration announced TrumpRx to lower the price of GLP-1 drugs to $245 per month for people covered by Medicare. Coverage for people with obesity and at least one comorbidity (elevated LDL-cholesterol, high blood pressure and/or MASLD) may be implemented as early as April 2026. The cost will be significantly higher because most insurance companies do not cover it in their formulary. Before this change, most people covered by Medicaid and CHIP paid $3 a month, the same as for brand-name medications.

Starting in July 2026, eligible Medicare beneficiaries will gain access to certain weight-loss medications for $50 a month through a temporary initiative called the Medicare GLP-1 Bridge program. This pilot is designed to create a more affordable pathway for people who need these treatments while broader, long-term coverage options are being finalized.

== Research ==
In a phase III trial, tirzepatide demonstrated clinically significant benefits among participants with obesity and heart failure with preserved ejection fraction. Over two years of follow-up, tirzepatide decreased participants' risk of major cardiovascular (CV) complications—a combined endpoint including urgent heart failure visits, hospitalizations, more frequent diuretic treatment, and CV mortality—by 38% compared to a placebo. An observational study on patients with obesity and type 2 diabetes and heart failure with preserved ejection fraction reported that tirzepatide had a lower risk of hospitalization for heart failure and all-cause death combined than sitagliptin. In a 72-week, phase IIIb open-label head-to-head trial of adults with obesity without diabetes, tirzepatide at the maximum tolerated dose produced greater mean weight loss than semaglutide and larger reductions in waist circumference, while gastrointestinal adverse events were the most common with both drugs.

A 2024 systematic review found that tirzepatide demonstrates benefits in the management of metabolic dysfunction–associated steatotic liver disease.

In September 2026, researchers presented results from a 48-week Phase 2b trial and a separate Phase 1b trial of eloralintide in combination with tirzepatide (EloraTZP) in obese adults with type 2 diabetes. Trial arm participants lost an average of nearly a quarter of their weight versus 14.8% with the highest dose of tirzepatide.
