= Gastric inhibitory polypeptide =

Mammalian protein found in Homo sapiens

GIP
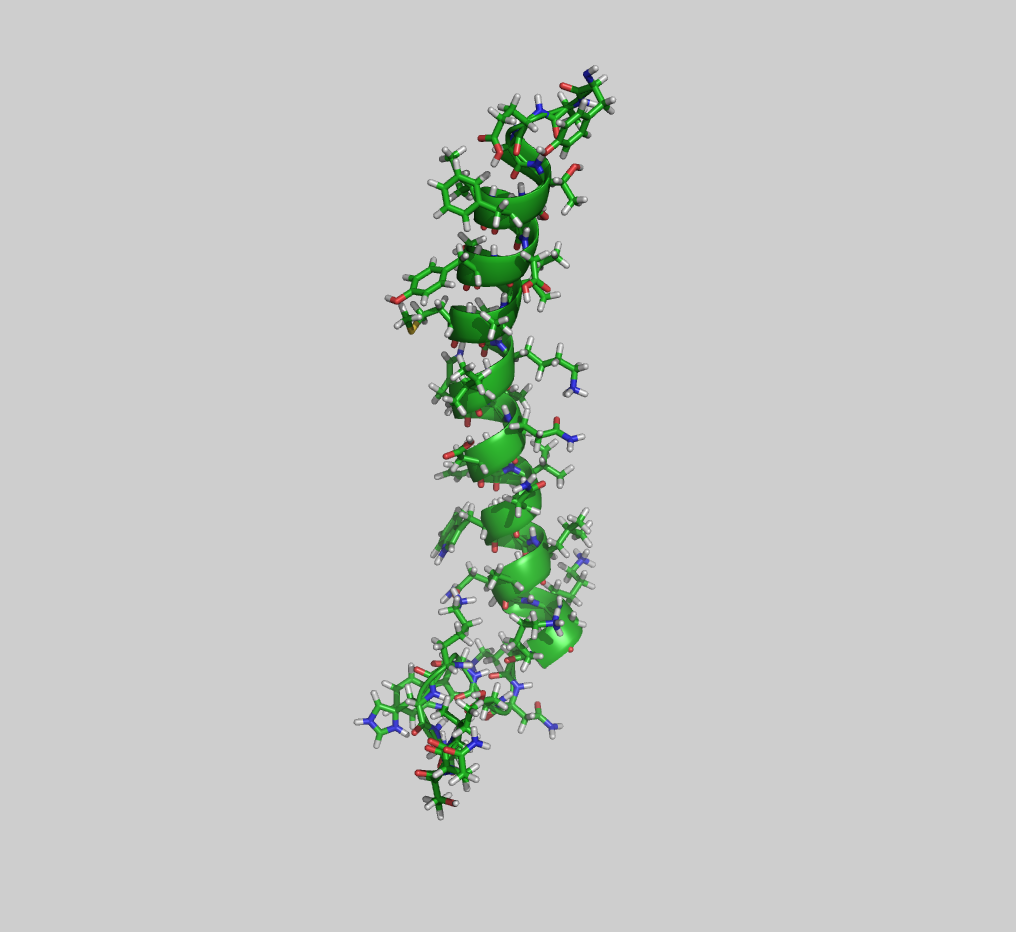

Identifiers
- Aliases: GIP, gastric inhibitory polypeptide
- External IDs: OMIM: 137240; MGI: 107504; GeneCards: GIP
Available structures
PDB	Ortholog search: PDBe RCSB
PDB	List of PDB id codes 2L71, 2B4N, 2OBU, 2QKH, 2L70, 1T5Q

Gene location (Human)
Chr.	Chromosome 17 (human)
Band	17q21.32	Start	48,958,554 bp
Band	17q21.32	End	48,968,596 bp

Gene location (Mouse)
Chr.	Chromosome 11 (mouse)
Band	11|11 D	Start	95,915,371 bp
Band	11|11 D	End	95,921,657 bp
RNA expression pattern
Bgee	Human / Mouse (ortholog); Top expressed in: jejunal mucosa; duodenum; gonad; testicle; buccal mucosa cell; pancreatic ductal cell; stromal cell of endometrium; sural nerve; placenta; liver / Top expressed in: duodenum; crypt of lieberkuhn of small intestine; jejunum; intestinal epithelium; epithelium of small intestine; intestinal villus; embryo; retinal pigment epithelium; morula; corneal stroma; More reference expression data
BioGPS	n/a
Gene ontology
Molecular function	hormone activity; protein binding; signaling receptor binding
Cellular component	cytoplasm; endoplasmic reticulum lumen; extracellular region; soma; secretory granule lumen; extracellular space
Biological process	response to selenium ion; response to amino acid; response to organic cyclic compound; digestive system development; regulation of insulin secretion; adult locomotory behavior; female pregnancy; response to peptide hormone; positive regulation of cAMP-mediated signaling; memory; response to glucose; response to lipid; response to nutrient levels; positive regulation of synaptic transmission; exploration behavior; response to axon injury; response to starvation; sensory perception of pain; positive regulation of glucagon secretion; positive regulation of glucose transmembrane transport; response to carbohydrate; triglyceride homeostasis; signal transduction; response to acidic pH; endocrine pancreas development; positive regulation of insulin secretion; long-term potentiation; regulation of signaling receptor activity; G protein-coupled receptor signaling pathway; regulation of fatty acid biosynthetic process
Sources:Amigo / QuickGO
Orthologs
Databases	NCBI: entry; OMA: entry
Species	Human	Mouse
Entrez	2695	14607
Ensembl	ENSG00000159224	ENSMUSG00000014351
UniProt	P09681	P48756
RefSeq (mRNA)	NM_004123	NM_008119
RefSeq (protein)	NP_004114	NP_032145
Location (UCSC)	Chr 17: 48.96 – 48.97 Mb	Chr 11: 95.92 – 95.92 Mb
PubMed search
- Wikidata
View/Edit Human	View/Edit Mouse

Gastric inhibitory polypeptide (GIP), also known as glucose-dependent insulinotropic polypeptide, is an inhibiting hormone of the secretin family of hormones. While it is a weak inhibitor of gastric acid secretion, its main role, being an incretin, is to stimulate insulin secretion.

GIP, along with glucagon-like peptide-1 (GLP-1), belongs to a class of molecules (incretins) which stimulate insulin release on oral food intake.

== Synthesis and transport ==
GIP is derived from a 153-amino acid proprotein encoded by the GIP gene and circulates as a biologically active 42-amino acid peptide. It is synthesized by K cells, which are found in the mucosa of the duodenum and the jejunum of the gastrointestinal tract.

Like all endocrine hormones, it is transported by the blood. Gastric inhibitory polypeptide receptors are seven-transmembrane protein (GPCRs) found in beta cells in the pancreas.

== Functions ==
GIP initially derived its name from its inhibitory effect on stomach acid secretion, its ability to protect the small intestine from acid-induced damage, its slowing of the pace with which consumed foods exit the stomach, and its reduction of general gastrointestinal motility. However, the initially hypothesized mechanism was incorrect, as it was later discovered that the hormone achieved its effects only when its concentration exceeded basal physiologic levels and that it operated similarly to secretin.

It is now believed that GIP primarily acts as an inducer of insulin secretion, which is stimulated primarily by hyperosmolarity of glucose in the duodenum. Since its mechanism was uncovered in 1995, the hormone has sometimes been referred to as glucose-dependent insulinotropic peptide, while retaining the acronym GIP. The amount of insulin secreted is greater when glucose is administered orally than intravenously.

In addition to its role as an incretin, GIP is known to inhibit apoptosis of pancreatic beta cells and to promote their proliferation. It also stimulates glucagon secretion and fat accumulation. GIP receptors are expressed in many organs and tissues including those of the central nervous system, enabling regulation of appetite and satiety. As of 2013, GIP was believed to be an important driver of bone remodeling. Researchers at the Universities of Angers and Ulster noted that genetic ablation of the GIP receptor in mice resulted in profound alterations of bone microarchitecture through modification of the adipokine network. Furthermore, a deficiency in GIP receptors has been associated in mice with a dramatic decrease in bone quality and a subsequent increase in fracture risk. However, the results of the two groups' studies were non-concordant.

== Pathology ==
It has been found that type 2 diabetics are not responsive to GIP and have lower levels of GIP secretion after a meal when compared to non-diabetics. In research involving knockout mice, it was found that absence of the GIP receptors correlates with resistance to obesity.

== Tirzepatide ==
Tirzepatide is an analog of the human GIP hormone with a C_{20} fatty diacid portion attached, which has been approved for treatment of diabetes in the U.S. in May 2022.
