= Glucagon-like peptide-1 =

Gastrointestinal peptide hormone involved in glucose homeostasis

GLP-1 and diabetes

Glucagon-like peptide-1 (GLP-1) is a peptide hormone produced by cleavage of proglucagon and secreted by the gastrointestinal tract, pancreas, and specific neurons when food is consumed. The actions of GLP-1 are to regulate blood sugar levels and lipid metabolism through stimulation of its receptors called glucagon-like peptide-1 receptors (GLP-1R) located on multiple cells and organs in humans.

GLP-1 is an incretin hormone having a role to control blood sugar levels by stimulating insulin secretion after eating. GLP-1 delays stomach emptying of food, thereby producing a feeling a fullness, inhibiting brain mechanisms that affect appetite, and reducing food intake. Its duration of action, however, is only over minutes when it undergoes rapid degradation by specific enzymes, such as dipeptidyl peptidase-4 (DPP-4), terminating its biological effects.

Drugs mimicking the effects of GLP-1, called GLP-1 receptor agonists, gained approval to treat type 2 diabetes and obesity in the early 21st century. Ongoing research indicates significant potential for GLP-1 drugs to treat diverse clinical conditions, including diabetes, cardiovascular and kidney diseases, and body weight. Adverse side effects of taking GLP-1 receptor agonists include nausea, diarrhea, and gastrointestinal discomfort.

== Gene expression ==
The proglucagon gene is expressed in several organs, including the pancreas (α-cells of the islets of Langerhans), gut (intestinal enteroendocrine L-cells) and brain (caudal brainstem and hypothalamus). Pancreatic proglucagon gene expression is promoted upon fasting and hypoglycaemia induction and inhibited by insulin. Conversely, intestinal proglucagon gene expression is reduced during fasting and stimulated upon food consumption. In mammals, the transcription gives rise to identical mRNA in all three cell types, which is further translated to the 180 amino acid precursor called proglucagon. However, as a result of tissue-specific posttranslational processing mechanisms, different peptides are produced in the different cells.

In the pancreas (α-cells of the islets of Langerhans), proglucagon is cleaved by prohormone convertase (PC) 2 producing glicentin-related pancreatic peptide (GRPP), glucagon, intervening peptide-1 (IP-1) and major proglucagon fragment (MPGF).

== Secretion ==
GLP-1 is packaged in secretory granules and secreted into the hepatic portal system by the intestinal L-cells located primarily in the distal ileum and colon, but also found in the jejunum and duodenum. The L-cells are open-type triangular epithelial cells directly in contact with the lumen and neurovascular tissue and are accordingly stimulated by various nutrient, neural and endocrine factors.

GLP-1 is released in a biphasic pattern with an early phase after 10–15 minutes followed by a longer second phase after 30–60 minutes upon meal ingestion. As the majority of L-cells are located in the distal ileum and colon, the early phase occurs by neural signalling, gut peptides or neurotransmitters. When GLP-1 binds to its receptors, it triggers activation of G-proteins, leading to a rise in intracellular second messenger cAMP, activating protein kinase A, secretion of insulin, and inhibiting the release of glucagon.

Fasting plasma concentrations of GLP-1 range between 0 and 15 pmol/L in humans, and are increased 2- to 3-fold upon food consumption depending on meal size and nutrient composition.

Sugars have been associated with various signalling pathways, which initiate depolarisation of the L-cell membrane causing an elevated concentration of cytosolic Ca^{2+}, which in turn induces GLP-1 secretion. Fatty acids have been associated with the mobilisation of intracellular Ca^{2+} stores and subsequently release of Ca^{2+} into the cytosol. The mechanisms of protein-triggered GLP-1 secretion are less clear, but the amino acid proportion and composition appear important to the stimulatory effect.

== Degradation ==
Once secreted, GLP-1 is extremely susceptible to the catalytic activity of the proteolytic enzyme dipeptidyl peptidase-4 (DPP-4). Specifically, DPP-4 cleaves the peptide bond between Ala^{8}-Glu^{9} resulting in the abundant GLP-1 (9–36) amide constituting 60–80% of total GLP-1 in the circulation. DPP-4 is widely expressed in multiple tissues and cell types, existing in both a membrane-anchored and soluble circulating form. DPP-4 is expressed on the surface of endothelial cells, including those located directly adjacent to GLP-1 secretion sites. Consequently, less than 25% of secreted GLP-1 is estimated to leave the gut intact. Additionally, presumably due to the high concentration of DPP-4 found on hepatocytes, 40–50% of the remaining active GLP-1 is degraded across the liver. Thus, due to the activity of DPP-4 only 10–15% of secreted GLP-1 reaches the circulation intact.

Neutral endopeptidase 24.11 (NEP 24.11) is a membrane-bound zinc metallopeptidase widely expressed in several tissues, but found in particularly high concentrations in the kidneys, which is also identified accountable for the rapid degradation of GLP-1. It primarily cleaves peptides at the N-terminal side of aromatic or hydrophobic amino acids and is estimated to contribute by up to 50% to GLP-1 degradation. However, the activity only becomes apparent once the degradation of DPP-4 has been prevented, as the majority of GLP-1 reaching the kidneys has already been processed by DPP-4. Similarly, renal clearance appears more significant for the elimination of already inactivated GLP-1.

Insulin-degrading enzyme (IDE) has also been identified as a GLP-1-degrading protease. Two IDE cleavage sites for GLP-1 exist in the brain, potentially having involvement in GLP-1 metabolism.

The resulting half-life of active GLP-1 in the circulation is about 2 minutes, a time sufficient to activate GLP-1 receptors.

== Physiological functions ==
Functions of GLP-1

GLP-1 enhances insulin secretion, inhibits glucagon release, delays stomach emptying, and reduces food intake through suppression of brain structures regulating appetite. Although reduced GLP-1 secretion has previously been associated with attenuated incretin effect in patients with type 2 diabetes, further research indicates that GLP-1 secretion in people with type 2 diabetes does not differ from healthy subjects.

An effect of GLP-1 is its ability to promote insulin secretion in a glucose-dependent manner. As GLP-1 binds to GLP-1 receptors expressed on pancreatic β cells, the receptors couple to G-protein subunits and activate adenylate cyclase, which increases the production of cAMP from ATP. Subsequently, activation of secondary pathways, including protein kinase A (PKA) and Epac2, alters cell ion channel activity, causing elevated levels of cytosolic Ca^{2+} that enhance exocytosis of insulin-containing granules. During the process, influx of glucose ensures sufficient ATP to sustain the stimulatory effect.

Additionally, GLP-1 ensures the β cell insulin stores are replenished to prevent exhaustion during secretion by promoting insulin gene transcription, mRNA stability and biosynthesis. GLP-1 also increases β cell mass by promoting proliferation and neogenesis while inhibiting apoptosis. As both type 1 and 2 diabetes are associated with reduction of functional β cells, this effect is desirable in diabetes treatment. An additional important effect of GLP-1, is inhibition of glucagon secretion at glucose levels above fasting levels. Critically, this does not affect the glucagon response to hypoglycemia as this effect is also glucose-dependent. The inhibitory effect is presumably mediated indirectly through somatostatin secretion, but a direct effect cannot be completely excluded.

In accordance with the expression of GLP-1 receptor on brainstem and hypothalamus, GLP-1 has been shown to promote satiety and thereby reduce food and water intake. Consequently, diabetic subjects treated with GLP-1 receptor agonists often experience weight loss as opposed to the weight gain commonly induced with other treatment agents.

=== Adverse effects ===
GLP-1 receptor agonists commonly cause gastrointestinal adverse effects, such as nausea, vomiting, diarrhea, constipation, and abdominal discomfort, especially during dose escalation.

== Research history ==
GLP-1 was first described 1979 by a research group of Werner Creutzfeldt in Göttingen. A 1982 report established the discovery that the gene for proglucagon actually codes for three peptides, namely glucagon and two novel peptides. Those two novel peptides were later isolated, identified, and are now known as glucagon-like peptide-1 and glucagon-like peptide-2.

In the 1980s, Svetlana Mojsov worked on the identification of GLP-1. To try to identify whether a specific fragment of GLP-q was an incretin, Mojsov identified that a stretch of 31 amino acids in the GLP-1 was an incretin. Small quantities of laboratory-synthesized GLP-1 could trigger insulin.

The discovery of GLP-1's extremely short half-life meant that it was impossible to develop into a drug. This caused diabetes research to shift towards other therapeutic options such as targeting the GLP-1 receptor, which then led to the development of GLP-1 receptor agonists.

A 2025 review indicated that GLP-1 receptor agonist drugs (GLP-1RA), particularly liraglutide, semaglutide, and tirzepatide, are effective for managing blood sugar levels, appetite, and body weight, having potential therapeutic uses for treating type 2 diabetes, obesity, and cardiovascular diseases. Ongoing epidemiological research shows that the common side effects of GLP-1RA drugs, including nausea and stomach discomfort – which are manageable and decrease over time – cause up to 50% of users to discontinue taking a GLP-1RA medication within the first year. The review found no clear evidence that GLP‐1RA drugs have severe adverse effects in users.

== See also ==
- Gastric inhibitory polypeptide (GIP)
- GLP-1 receptor agonists: albiglutide, dulaglutide, exenatide, liraglutide, lixisenatide, semaglutide, and tirzepatide
- Glucagon-like peptide-1 receptor
