= Gastric inhibitory polypeptide receptor =

Protein-coding gene in the species Homo sapiens

GIPR

Identifiers
- Aliases: GIPR, PGQTL2, gastric inhibitory polypeptide receptor
- External IDs: OMIM: 137241; MGI: 1352753; GeneCards: GIPR
Available structures
PDB	Ortholog search: PDBe RCSB
PDB	List of PDB id codes 4HJ0, 2QKH

Gene location (Human)
Chr.	Chromosome 19 (human)
Band	19q13.32	Start	45,668,221 bp
Band	19q13.32	End	45,683,722 bp

Gene location (Mouse)
Chr.	Chromosome 7 (mouse)
Band	7|7 A3	Start	18,889,986 bp
Band	7|7 A3	End	18,900,052 bp
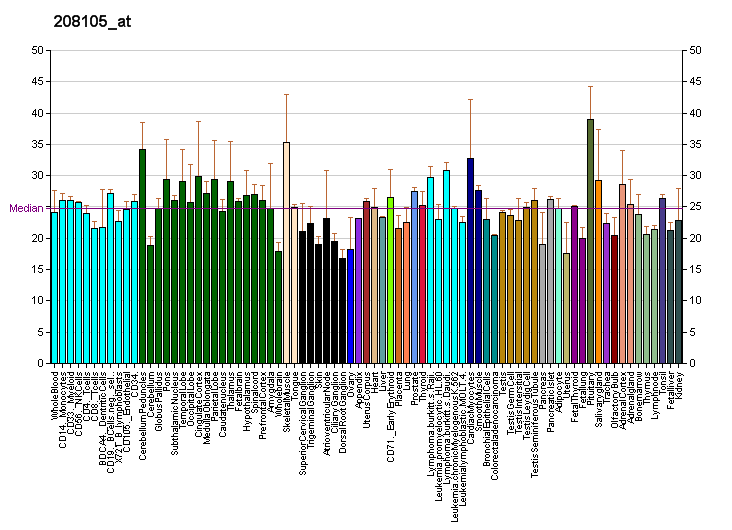
RNA expression pattern
Bgee	Human / Mouse (ortholog); Top expressed in: right uterine tube; apex of heart; right auricle of heart; olfactory zone of nasal mucosa; body of pancreas; granulocyte; body of stomach; islet of Langerhans; minor salivary glands; bronchial epithelial cell / Top expressed in: islet of Langerhans; embryo; morula; spermatid; blastocyst; ventricular zone; ganglionic eminence; left lung lobe; primary visual cortex; superior frontal gyrus; More reference expression data
BioGPS	More reference expression data
Gene ontology
Molecular function	G protein-coupled receptor activity; signal transducer activity; gastric inhibitory peptide receptor activity; transmembrane signaling receptor activity; protein binding; peptide hormone binding; G protein-coupled peptide receptor activity
Cellular component	integral component of membrane; membrane; plasma membrane
Biological process	response to fatty acid; response to nutrient; regulation of insulin secretion; positive regulation of cytosolic calcium ion concentration; response to glucose; generation of precursor metabolites and energy; activation of adenylate cyclase activity; response to calcium ion; cell surface receptor signaling pathway; gastric inhibitory peptide signaling pathway; response to axon injury; desensitization of G protein-coupled receptor signaling pathway; endocrine pancreas development; signal transduction; positive regulation of insulin secretion; G protein-coupled receptor signaling pathway; positive regulation of cAMP-mediated signaling
Sources:Amigo / QuickGO
Orthologs
Databases	NCBI: entry; OMA: entry
Species	Human	Mouse
Entrez	2696	381853
Ensembl	ENSG00000010310	ENSMUSG00000030406
UniProt	P48546	Q0P543
RefSeq (mRNA)	NM_000164; NM_001308418	NM_001080815
RefSeq (protein)	NP_000155; NP_001295347	NP_001074284
Location (UCSC)	Chr 19: 45.67 – 45.68 Mb	Chr 7: 18.89 – 18.9 Mb
PubMed search
- Wikidata
View/Edit Human	View/Edit Mouse

The gastric inhibitory polypeptide receptor (GIP-R), also known as the glucose-dependent insulinotropic polypeptide receptor, is a protein that in humans is encoded by the GIPR gene.

GIP-R is a member of the class B family of G protein–coupled receptors. GIP-R is found on beta-cells in the pancreas, where it serves as the receptor for the gastric inhibitory polypeptide (GIP).

== Function ==
Gastric inhibitory polypeptide, also called glucose-dependent insulinotropic polypeptide, is a 42-amino acid polypeptide synthesized by K cells of the duodenum and small intestine. It was originally identified as an activity in gut extracts that inhibited gastric acid secretion and gastrin release, but subsequently was demonstrated to stimulate insulin release potently in the presence of elevated glucose. The insulinotropic effect on pancreatic islet beta-cells was then recognized to be the principal physiologic action of GIP. Together with glucagon-like peptide-1, GIP is largely responsible for the secretion of insulin after eating. It is involved in several other facets of the anabolic response.
