= GLP-1 receptor agonist =

Class of medication

Glucagon-like peptide-1 (GLP-1) receptor agonists, also known as GLP-1 agonists, GLP-1RAs, and informally as simply GLP-1s, are a class of medications that activate the GLP-1 receptor, causing reduced blood sugar, reduced appetite, and reduced energy intake. GLP-1 analogs are molecules that are structurally almost identical to the endogenous GLP-1 hormone. Incretin mimetics are substances that mimic the actions of incretin hormones such as GLP-1 and GIP.

Originally developed to treat type 2 diabetes, some GLP-1 agonists have been approved to treat obesity. They mimic the actions of the endogenous incretin hormone GLP-1, which is released in the small intestine and can inhibit glucagon release and increase insulin secretion.

GLP-1 receptor agonists are used to treat type 2 diabetes and obesity, and are under study for treatment of metabolic dysfunction–associated steatotic liver disease, polyendocrine metabolic ovarian syndrome, and diseases of the reward system, such as addictions (especially from ultra-processed foods).

== Pharmacology ==
=== Mechanism of action ===
GLP-1 agonists work by activating the GLP-1 receptor, which is found all around the body. Some sites are on beta cells in the pancreas and on neurons in the brain. Another class of anti-diabetes drugs, DPP-4 inhibitors, work by reducing the breakdown of endogenous GLP-1, and are generally considered less potent than GLP-1 agonists.

==== Pancreatic and glycemic control ====
GLP-1 receptor activation slows gastric emptying, inhibits the release of glucagon, and stimulates insulin production, thereby improving glucose homeostasis in people with type 2 diabetes. At the cellular level, binding to the GLP-1 receptor on pancreatic beta cells elevates intracellular cyclic AMP (cAMP) and activates protein kinase A (PKA). This cascade triggers the influx of calcium, which directly prompts the exocytosis of insulin-containing vesicles. Furthermore, GLP-1 agonists actively ameliorate peripheral insulin resistance by upregulating phosphorylated IRS-1 and promoting the transport of the GLUT4 transporter to cell membranes in muscle and adipose tissue.

==== Central nervous system and appetite regulation ====
GLP-1 receptor activation stimulates satiety, thus reducing food intake, promoting the development of a negative energy balance, and decreasing body weight over time, making GLP-1 agonists a treatment option for obesity. In the hypothalamus, this is achieved by stimulating anorexigenic (satiety-inducing) POMC and CART neurons while simultaneously inhibiting orexigenic (appetite-inducing) AgRP and NPY neurons. GLP-1 agonists also counteract obesity-induced leptin resistance. They do this by downregulating inhibitory proteins like SOCS3 and PTP1B, which restores the brain's JAK/STAT signaling cascade and re-establishes sensitivity to leptin.

==== Adipose tissue and metabolism ====
In obesity, white adipose tissue undergoes abnormal hypertrophic growth, leading to hypoxia and systemic inflammation. GLP-1 agonists mitigate this by downregulating lipogenic enzymes such as lipoprotein lipase (LPL) and ANGPTL4. Additionally, they promote the "browning" of energy-storing white adipose tissue into energy-burning brown adipose tissue. This metabolic shift is mediated by the activation of AMPK and SIRT1 pathways, which upregulate uncoupling protein 1 (UCP1) and increase cellular thermogenesis and energy expenditure. Some of the metabolic effects of GLP-1 agonists in rodents are also mediated via increased synthesis of fibroblast growth factor 21. Pharmaceutical companies have developed dual GLP-1/FGF21 receptor agonists.

=== Pharmacokinetics ===
The naturally occurring native GLP-1 hormone is considered a peptide hormone. It has a half-life of only about two minutes, because the dipeptidyl peptidase-4 (DPP-4) enzyme rapidly breaks it down. As a result, different GLP-1 agonist drugs are modified in various ways to extend the half-life, resulting in drugs that can be dosed daily, weekly, or less often. Many commonly used synthetic GLP-1 agonists are delivered weekly by subcutaneous injection, which is a barrier to their use and reason for discontinuation. Most GLP-1 medications are approved by the FDA and sold as drug-device combination products, which include auto-injecting pens. Self-injected drugs are especially difficult for people with vision or motor difficulties, which commonly accompany type 2 diabetes. Attempts to develop an orally bioavailable GLP-1 agonist, either a modified peptide, as in the case of oral semaglutide, or a small molecule drug, have produced additional drug candidates. Other companies have tested inhaled or transdermal administration. An oral semaglutide pill was approved by the FDA in December 2025 and entered mass production in January 2026.

== Uses ==
=== Type 2 diabetes ===
GLP-1 agonists were initially developed to treat type 2 diabetes. The 2025 American Diabetes Association (ADA) standard of care in diabetes include GLP-1 agonists or SGLT2 inhibitors as a first-line pharmacological therapy for type 2 diabetes in people who have or are at high risk for atherosclerotic cardiovascular disease or heart failure. The ADA also recommends GLP-1 agonists for people with both type 2 diabetes and kidney disease. GLP-1 agonists and SGLT2 inhibitors can be combined with metformin, which has shown an enhanced lowering of A1C. GLP-1 receptor agonists are not recommended for use in combination with DPP-4 enzyme inhibitors due to lack of evidence.

One advantage of GLP-1 agonists over older insulin secretagogues such as sulfonylureas or meglitinides is that they have a lower risk of hypoglycemia, while improving weight and cardiovascular and kidney health. ADA also recommends use of GLP-1 agonists instead of starting insulin therapy in people with type 2 diabetes who need additional glucose control, except when catabolism, hyperglycemia, or autoimmune diabetes is suspected.

A 2021 meta-analysis reported a 12% reduction in all-cause mortality when GLP-1 agonists are used in the treatment of type 2 diabetes, as well as significant improvements in cardiovascular and renal outcomes relative to nonusers. A 2023 meta-analysis including 13 cardiovascular outcome trials reported that SGLT2 inhibitors reduce the risk for three-point major adverse cardiovascular events, especially in subjects with an estimated glomerular filtration rate (eGFR) below 60 mL/min, whereas GLP-1 receptor agonists were more beneficial in people with higher eGFRs. Likewise, the relative risk reduction of SGLT-2 inhibitor treatment was larger in populations with a higher proportion of albuminuria, but this relationship was not observed for GLP-1 receptor agonists. This suggests differential use of the two substance classes in people with preserved and reduced renal function or with and without diabetic nephropathy, respectively. GLP-1 agonists and SGLT2 inhibitors work to reduce HbA1c by different mechanisms and can be combined for enhanced effects. They may provide additive cardioprotective effects.

The US Food and Drug Administration has not approved GLP-1 agonists for type 1 diabetes, but they have been used off-label in addition to insulin.

=== Obesity ===
GLP-1 agonists are recommended as an add-on therapy to lifestyle intervention (calorie restriction and exercise) in people with a BMI ≥ 30 kg/m^{2} or with a BMI ≥ 27 kg/m^{2} with at least one weight-related comorbidity, which can include high blood pressure or high cholesterol. Some GLP-1 agonists are more effective than other weight-loss drugs, but bariatric surgery is still considered the most effective and sustainable way to lose weight. Genetics is believed to play a role in both GLP-1 weight loss efficacy and side effects. GLP-1 agonists' weight-reducing effects come from a combination of peripheral effects and activity in the central nervous system. In the brain, GLP-1 agonists reduce weight by crossing the blood–brain barrier, via passive diffusion or receptor mediated transcytosis, and directly activating the satiety hormones in the hypothalamus.

Three GLP-1 auto-injector medications are approved specifically for weight management: semaglutide (Wegovy), tirzepatide (Zepbound), and liraglutide (Saxenda).

In randomized controlled trials, people lose on average 5–20% of their initial body weight depending on the substance and the dose. Studies reported that on average people regain more than half (50–70%) of the lost weight within a year after stopping any of these medications. People return to their previous weight within a year and a half after stopping these medications. Studies show that there is no improvement in quality of life despite the weight loss.

=== Metabolic dysfunction–associated steatotic liver disease ===
A 2023 systematic review reported that GLP-1 agonists are as effective a treatment for metabolic dysfunction–associated steatotic liver disease (MASLD) as the medications in current use, pioglitazone and vitamin E. It noted a reduction in steatosis, ballooning necrosis, lobular inflammation, and fibrosis.

Wegovy (semaglutide) is approved by the FDA to treat MASH (metabolic dysfunction-associated steatohepatitis) with stage 2 or stage 3 liver fibrosis. The mechanism of action for this treatment is under investigation, but part 1 of its stage 3 clinical trials saw a 60% reduction in liver inflammation. Clinical trials are ongoing.

== Adverse effects ==
GLP-1 agonists' most common adverse effects are gastrointestinal. These limit the maximum tolerated dose and require gradual dose escalation. Nausea, vomiting, diarrhea, and constipation are commonly reported. Nausea is directly related to serum concentration and is reported in up to three-quarters of people using short-acting GLP-1 agonists, but fewer of those using long-acting agonists. Injection site reactions are common, especially with shorter-acting drugs.

GLP-1 agonists appear to increase the risk of non-arteritic anterior ischemic optic neuropathy.

Some people develop anti-drug antibodies, which are more common with exenatide (the antibodies were detectable in a third or more of people) than other GLP-1 agonists and can decrease efficacy. Gallstones may form while attempting to induce rapid weight loss.

The risk of aspiration under anesthesia is higher due to delayed gastric emptying, according to case reports. In 2024, the American Society of Anesthesiologists and others suggested suspending GLP-1 agonist treatment in most people on the day of the procedure for daily dosing or a week before for weekly dosing.

A 2024 study suggested that GLP-1 weight-loss medications do not increase the risk of suicide or suicidal thoughts in children and adolescents, contrary to some previous concerns. The study included over 54,000 U.S. adolescents and reported a 33% reduction in the risk of suicidal thoughts and attempts among those using the drugs compared to those who did not. In January 2026, the US Food and Drug Administration requested removal of suicidal behavior and ideation warnings from glucagon-like peptide-1 receptor agonist (GLP-1 RA) medications.

While adolescents taking GLP-1 drugs experienced more gastrointestinal symptoms, they had a lower risk of acute pancreatitis compared to the control group. A similar study in adults reported similar results for semaglutide.

A 2025 study suggested that GLP-1 agonists increased risks of hypotension (low blood pressure), syncope (fainting), joint diseases, nephrolithiasis (kidney stones), interstitial nephritis, and acute pancreatitis.

=== Thyroid cancer ===
The US Food and Drug Administration requires a boxed warning in the package inserts of GLP-1 agonists due to the risk of thyroid C-cell tumors, including medullary thyroid cancer (MTC). GLP-1 agonists are contraindicated in people with a family or personal history of MTC or multiple endocrine neoplasia type 2. In mice, long-term use of GLP-1 agonists stimulates calcitonin secretion, leading to C-cell hypertrophy and increased risk of thyroid cancer, but no increased secretion of calcitonin has been observed in humans. A retrospective national cohort study in France reported an increased risk of thyroid cancer (all and medullary) after 1–3 years of treatment with GLP-1 agonists for diabetes, but other large retrospective studies have not reported a similar association, including with long-term use of GLP-1 agonists and over 10 years of followup.

== Society and culture ==
Influencers and celebrities popularized GLP-1 agonists in the early 2020s, causing many people to seek them for cosmetic or health-based weight loss.

=== Cost ===
GLP-1 agonists are more expensive than other treatments for type 2 diabetes. A study compared the cost-effectiveness of GLP-1 agonists to long-acting insulin in a Taiwanese population with type 2 diabetes. In people with cardiovascular disease (CVD), GLP-1 agonists were estimated to save money due to fewer cardiovascular incidents. In people without CVD, the cost per QALY was $9,093. In the United States, cost is the highest barrier to GLP-1 agonist usage and was reported as the reason for discontinuation in 48.6% of people who stopped using the drugs. According to a 2023 study, GLP-1 agonists were not cost-effective for pediatric obesity in the U.S. As of late 2025, prices had dropped substantially. In 2025 it was estimated that Medicare coverage of GLP-1RA agonists for obesity in the United States would increase federal spending by $69.5 billion over a decade.

Mixed results have been found when economic evaluations of glucagon like peptide-1 (GLP-1) receptor agonists have been done, specifically in response to its use for obesity treatment in people without diabetes. A 2026 review concluded that, due to their high acquisition costs, GLP-1 receptor agonists are generally not cost-effective compared to lifestyle interventions or no treatment at all from a healthcare-payer perspective. The analysis also reported that cost-effectiveness outcomes vary drastically depending on assumptions related to treatment duration, long-term weight maintenance, and the time horizon of the specific model. Over longer periods, or populations at high risk of obesity, GLP-1 receptor agonists may have a more favorable cost-effectiveness analysis. Despite the economic considerations, GLP-1 receptor agonists are included in clinical guidelines for obesity management due to their demonstrated efficacy in weight loss and cardiometabolic risk improvement. The high cost has been identified and is seen as a barrier to access and widespread use in many healthcare systems.

=== Health economics and cost effects ===
Compared to insulin therapy in patients with type 2 diabetes requiring treatment, GLP-1 RAs may be more cost-effective. In a recent observation of a cohort study using Taiwan's National Health Insurance Research Database, GLP-1 RA therapy was associated with improved clinical outcomes. This includes reductions in mortality and hospitalized hypoglycemia relative to insulin. From an economic perspective, GLP-1 RAs were associated with higher direct drug costs but demonstrated value when evaluated against clinical outcomes. The cost per case prevented was approximately $54,851 for all-cause mortality and $29,115 for hospitalized hypoglycemia from the perspective of a third-party payer. But GLP-1 RA use was associated with net cost savings and reflected a downward movement of healthcare use. Studies found that GLP-1 RAs are cost-effective for only some patients. These population groups are limited to long-term cardiovascular and metabolic benefits. Overall, evidence suggests that though these receptor agonists have higher upfront costs, their ability to reduce adverse clinical events may make them a more cost-effective therapy option.

==== Medicare, Medicaid, and CHIP coverage ====
On 4 April 2025, the Trump administration declined to finalize a proposal from the Biden administration that would have required Medicare, Medicaid, and CHIP to broadly cover GLP-1s for weight loss. Despite the rejection, CMS has indicated that it might cover obesity medication in future rulemaking. But in November 2025, the Trump administration announced TrumpRx, an initiative similar to GoodRx to lower the price of GLP-1s to $245 per month for patients covered by Medicaid and CHIP and $50-month for Medicare patients if states opted in. Coverage for patients with obesity and at least one comorbidity like (elevated LDL-cholesterol, high blood pressure, or MASLD), will be implemented as early as 1 April 2026. The cost will be significantly higher to taxpayers since most health insurance companies do not cover it in their formulary. Before this change, most Medicaid and CHIP patients paid $3 a month, the same price as for brand-name medication. In December 2025, CMS announced the Medicare GLP-1 Bridge, a demonstration program running from 1 July to 31 December 2026, giving eligible Medicare Part D beneficiaries access to Wegovy and Zepbound at $50 per month. A longer-term program, the BALANCE Model, is planned for January 2027.

=== Future coverage in health care plans ===
Randomized clinical trials of GLP-1 antagonists found that more than one-third of participants who were overweight or obese lost 20% or more of their weight. Due to substantial weight loss it is predicted that health care spending would decrease for people who are obese or overweight after taking GLP-1 antagonists to lose weight. This creates an incentive for health care plans and Medicare to include weight loss treatments.

=== Legal status ===
- liraglutide (Victoza for type 2 diabetes, Saxenda for weight management, manufactured by Novo), approved in 2010/2014
- dulaglutide (Trulicity, manufactured by Eli Lilly), approved in 2014
- semaglutide (Ozempic and Rybelsus for diabetes, Wegovy for weight management, manufactured by Novo), approved in 2021/2019/2021
- tirzepatide (a GIP analog with dual GLP-1 receptor and GIP receptor agonism; Mounjaro for diabetes, Zepbound for weight management, manufactured by Eli Lilly), approved in 2022/2024

Discontinued:

- exenatide (brand names Byetta and Bydureon, manufactured by AstraZeneca), approved 2005/2012, discontinued in 2024
- albiglutide (Tanzeum, manufactured by GSK), approved in 2014, discontinued in 2017
- lixisenatide (Lyxumia in Europe, Adlyxin in the United States, manufactured by Sanofi), approved in 2016, discontinued in 2023

=== Combination and multiple target drugs ===
Some GLP-1 agonists, such as tirzepatide, are also agonists of the GIP receptor, glucagon receptor, and/or amylin receptor. These additional targets are hoped to increase the amount of weight loss the drugs cause.

=== Alternatives to approved sources ===
Gray market sellers offer unauthorized products they claim are GLP-1 agonists. Some buyers turn to unauthorized retailers if they cannot afford the name-brand drug. Buyers face risks due to counterfeit or substandard drugs.

In the United States, compounding pharmacies may sell custom-made versions of a drug if there is a declared shortage and they obtain the active pharmaceutical ingredient from an FDA-approved facility. The FDA declared shortages of injectable versions of semaglutide, tirzepatide, dulaglutide, liraglutide, and exenatide in 2022. The tirzepatide shortage ended in 2024. Al Carter, executive director of the National Association of Boards of Pharmacy, a trade organization for pharmacy regulators, estimated that 95% of online compounding pharmacies were operating illegally in 2024. As of January 2026, there were up to 1.5 million users of compounded GLP-1 receptor agonist drugs in the U.S., according to Novo CEO Mike Doustdar. He decried the practice of selling what he called "unsafe, knock-off products" while conceding that compounding pharmacies capture price-sensitive consumers in a way that his company, with its more expensive branded offerings, cannot.

=== Patents and regulatory exclusions ===
GLP-1 drugs are protected by patents and regulatory exclusivities, which delay generic competitors and keep prices high. The drugs have a median of 20 patents. These patents have protection periods averaging 18 years. The patents apply not only to the drugs but also to injection devices, delivery systems, and other components. Overlapping patents make it hard for generic manufacturers to enter the market. This creates a tradeoff between short-term affordability and long-term pharmaceutical innovation. Semaglutide's main patent expired in 2026 in several countries, but lasts until the early 2030s in many others.

== History ==
During the 1980s, Jean-Pierre Raufman worked as a postdoctoral researcher at the National Institutes of Health for John Pisano, a biochemist who specialized in collecting venom from various animals and looking for novel substances that could affect human physiology. In the course of this work, Raufman focused on the Gila monster, because he was curious about its practice of eating once or twice per year. He reported that Gila monster venom had biologically active molecules that provoked inflammation of the pancreas in test animals.

In 1992, after learning of Raufman's findings, John Eng of the Veterans Administration Medical Center in New York City used radioimmunoassay to isolate a novel substance from Gila monster venom. The new substance, which Eng called exendin-4, was similar to GLP-1 in that it reduced blood glucose in diabetic mice, but exendin-4 had a much longer half-life than GLP-1, whose extremely short half-life had defeated earlier attempts to turn it into a drug.

Eng filed a patent application for exendin-4 in 1993. He then spent three years searching for a pharmaceutical industry partner interested in commercializing exendin-4. In 1996, Amylin Pharmaceuticals licensed Eng's patent and created a synthetic version of exendin-4 called exenatide. In 2002, Eli Lilly and Company partnered with Amylin to develop exenatide and secure approval to market the drug. Exenatide's 2005 approval by the U.S. Food and Drug Administration showed that targeting the GLP-1 receptor was a viable strategy and inspired other pharmaceutical companies to focus on that receptor.

In 2011, Lilly and Amylin dissolved their partnership, with Amylin keeping the rights to exenatide. Lilly continued to develop drugs of the same class.

The 2024 American Diabetes Association conference included presentations on at least 27 GLP-1 receptor agonists then in development. By July 2024, Novo's semaglutide and Eli Lilly's tirzepatide were ranked among the world's most popular and lucrative drugs. Novo's rollout of semaglutide turned it into the most valuable company in Europe in 2024. Its market capitalization of $570 billion was larger than the entire economy of its home country of Denmark; its $2.3 billion income tax bill for 2023 made it the country's largest taxpayer; and its rapid growth represented nearly all of Denmark's economic growth. By October 2024, tirzepatide had turned Eli Lilly into the world's most valuable drug company.

== Research ==
Under research are GLP1 poly-agonist peptides, dual and triple receptor agonists such as tirzepatide (GLP-1 + GIP) and retatrutide (GLP-1 + GIP + glucagon), and combinations such as cagrilintide/semaglutide, which combines semaglutide with a dual amylin and calcitonin receptor agonist, and amycretin, which acts as both a GLP1 and an amylin agonist.

=== Alzheimer's disease ===
In November 2025, Novo announced top-line results from two large-scale studies, evoke and evoke+. The studies reported failure to slow the progression of Alzheimer's disease versus placebo.

=== Cardiovascular effects ===
A 2022 study reported that GLP-1 agonists have cardioprotective effects when used to treat obesity, beyond their primary roles in glycemic control and weight reduction.

=== Cancer ===
In a 2024 retrospective study, GLP-1 exposure was associated with a lower risk of specific obesity-associated cancers compared with insulin or metformin among people with type 2 diabetes. Compared to insulin, GLP-1 agonists showed significant risk reduction in esophageal, colorectal, endometrial, gallbladder, kidney, liver, ovarian, and pancreatic cancer, as well as meningioma and multiple myeloma. Kidney cancers showed an increased risk with GLP-1 treatment relative to those treated with metformin.

=== Depression ===
Studies have reported that GLP-1 agonists have antidepressant and neuroprotective effects and treat the metabolic consequences of second-generation antipsychotics, such as obesity.

=== Parkinson's disease ===
A 2022 UK study failed to find any advantage of using GLP-1 agonists to treat Parkinson's disease.

=== Polyendocrine metabolic ovarian syndrome ===
GLP-1 agonists are effective in reducing body weight in people with obesity and polyendocrine metabolic ovarian syndrome, but the effectiveness in polyendocrine metabolic ovarian syndrome without obesity is uncertain.

=== Reward system disorders ===
GLP-1 agonists are under development for substance use disorder, a condition with few pharmacological treatment options. A 2022 study reported reductions in drug and alcohol use in non-human animals.

=== Behavioral effects ===
A 2026 U.S. study reported that the association between impulsivity and violent behavior was weaker among current than former GLP-1 agonist users.
