= Semaglutide =

Anti-diabetic and anti-obesity medication

Clinical data
- Pronunciation: /sɛmˈæɡlʊtaɪd/ sem-AG-luu-tyde or /ˌsɛməˈɡluːtaɪd/ SEM-ə-GLOO-tyde
- Trade names: Ozempic, Rybelsus, Wegovy, others
- AHFS/Drugs.com: Monograph
- MedlinePlus: a618008
- License data: US DailyMed: Semaglutide
- Pregnancy category: AU: D
- Routes of administration: Subcutaneous, oral
- ATC code: A10BJ06 (WHO)

Legal status
- Legal status: AU: S4 (Prescription only); CA: ℞-only / Schedule D; UK: POM (Prescription only); US: ℞-only; EU: Rx-only; SE: Rx-only

Pharmacokinetic data
- Bioavailability: 89% (Subcutaneous), 1–2% (Oral)
- Metabolism: Proteolysis
- Elimination half-life: 7 days
- Duration of action: 63.6 hours
- Excretion: Urine and feces

Identifiers
- IUPAC name: 18-[[(1R)-4-[2-[2-[2-[2-[2-[2-[[(5S)-5-[[(2S)-2-[[(2S)-2-[[(2S)-5-amino-2-[[2-[[(2S)-2-[[(2S)-2-[[(2S)-2-[[(2S)-2-[[(2S)-2-[[(2S)-2-[[(2S)-2-[[(2S)-2-[[(2S,3R)-2-[[(2S)-2-[[(2S,3R)-2-[[2-[[(2S)-2-[[2-[[(2S)-2-amino-3-(1H-imidazol-5-yl)propanoyl]amino]-2-methylpropanoyl]amino]-4-carboxybutanoyl]amino]acetyl]amino]-3-hydroxybutanoyl]amino]-3-phenylpropanoyl]amino]-3-hydroxybutanoyl]amino]-3-hydroxypropanoyl]amino]-3-carboxypropanoyl]amino]-3-methylbutanoyl]amino]-3-hydroxypropanoyl]amino]-3-hydroxypropanoyl]amino]-3-(4-hydroxyphenyl)propanoyl]amino]-4-methylpentanoyl]amino]-4-carboxybutanoyl]amino]acetyl]amino]-5-oxopentanoyl]amino]propanoyl]amino]propanoyl]amino]-6-[[(2S)-1-[[(2S)-1-[[(2S,3S)-1-[[(2S)-1-[[(2S)-1-[[(2S)-1-[[(2S)-1-[[(2S)-5-carbamimidamido-1-[[2-[[(2S)-5-carbamimidamido-1-(carboxymethylamino)-1-oxopentan-2-yl]amino]-2-oxoethyl]amino]-1-oxopentan-2-yl]amino]-3-methyl-1-oxobutan-2-yl]amino]-4-methyl-1-oxopentan-2-yl]amino]-3-(1H-indol-3-yl)-1-oxopropan-2-yl]amino]-1-oxopropan-2-yl]amino]-3-methyl-1-oxopentan-2-yl]amino]-1-oxo-3-phenylpropan-2-yl]amino]-4-carboxy-1-oxobutan-2-yl]amino]-6-oxohexyl]amino]-2-oxoethoxy]ethoxy]ethylamino]-2-oxoethoxy]ethoxy]ethylamino]-1-carboxy-4-oxobutyl]amino]-18-oxooctadecanoic acid
- CAS Number: 910463-68-2
- PubChem CID: 56843331
- DrugBank: DB13928
- ChemSpider: 34981134
- UNII: 53AXN4NNHX
- KEGG: D10025
- ChEBI: CHEBI:167574
- ECHA InfoCard: 100.219.541

Chemical and physical data
- Formula: C_{187}H_{291}N_{45}O_{59}
- Molar mass: 4113.641 g·mol^{−1}
- 3D model (JSmol): Interactive image
- SMILES: CC[C@H](C)[C@H](NC(=O)[C@H](Cc1ccccc1)NC(=O)[C@H](CCC(=O)O)NC(=O)[C@H](CCCCNC(=O)COCCOCCNC(=O)COCCOCCNC(=O)CC[C@H](NC(=O)CCCCCCCCCCCCCCCCC(=O)O)C(=O)O)NC(=O)[C@H](C)NC(=O)[C@H](C)NC(=O)[C@H](CCC(N)=O)NC(=O)CNC(=O)[C@H](CCC(=O)O)NC(=O)[C@H](CC(C)C)NC(=O)[C@H](Cc1ccc(O)cc1)NC(=O)[C@H](CO)NC(=O)[C@H](CO)NC(=O)[C@@H](NC(=O)[C@H](CC(=O)O)NC(=O)[C@H](CO)NC(=O)[C@@H](NC(=O)[C@H](Cc1ccccc1)NC(=O)[C@@H](NC(=O)CNC(=O)[C@H](CCC(=O)O)NC(=O)C(C)(C)NC(=O)[C@@H](N)Cc1c[nH]cn1)[C@@H](C)O)[C@@H](C)O)C(C)C)C(=O)N[C@@H](C)C(=O)N[C@@H](Cc1c[nH]c2ccccc12)C(=O)N[C@@H](CC(C)C)C(=O)N[C@H](C(=O)N[C@@H](CCCNC(=N)N)C(=O)NCC(=O)N[C@@H](CCCNC(=N)N)C(=O)NCC(=O)O)C(C)C
- InChI: InChI=1S/C187H291N45O59/c1-18-105(10)154(180(282)208-108(13)159(261)216-133(86-114-89-200-119-50-40-39-49-117(114)119)170(272)218-129(82-102(4)5)171(273)228-152(103(6)7)178(280)215-121(53-44-72-199-186(192)193)162(264)201-91-141(242)209-120(52-43-71-198-185(190)191)161(263)204-94-151(257)258)230-172(274)131(83-111-45-33-31-34-46-111)219-167(269)126(64-69-149(253)254)214-166(268)122(51-41-42-70-195-144(245)98-290-79-78-289-76-74-197-145(246)99-291-80-77-288-75-73-196-139(240)66-61-127(183(285)286)211-140(241)54-37-29-27-25-23-21-19-20-22-24-26-28-30-38-55-146(247)248)212-158(260)107(12)206-157(259)106(11)207-165(267)125(60-65-138(189)239)210-142(243)92-202-163(265)123(62-67-147(249)250)213-168(270)128(81-101(2)3)217-169(271)130(85-113-56-58-116(238)59-57-113)220-175(277)135(95-233)223-177(279)137(97-235)224-179(281)153(104(8)9)229-174(276)134(88-150(255)256)221-176(278)136(96-234)225-182(284)156(110(15)237)231-173(275)132(84-112-47-35-32-36-48-112)222-181(283)155(109(14)236)227-143(244)93-203-164(266)124(63-68-148(251)252)226-184(287)187(16,17)232-160(262)118(188)87-115-90-194-100-205-115/h31-36,39-40,45-50,56-59,89-90,100-110,118,120-137,152-156,200,233-238H,18-30,37-38,41-44,51-55,60-88,91-99,188H2,1-17H3,(H2,189,239)(H,194,205)(H,195,245)(H,196,240)(H,197,246)(H,201,264)(H,202,265)(H,203,266)(H,204,263)(H,206,259)(H,207,267)(H,208,282)(H,209,242)(H,210,243)(H,211,241)(H,212,260)(H,213,270)(H,214,268)(H,215,280)(H,216,261)(H,217,271)(H,218,272)(H,219,269)(H,220,277)(H,221,278)(H,222,283)(H,223,279)(H,224,281)(H,225,284)(H,226,287)(H,227,244)(H,228,273)(H,229,276)(H,230,274)(H,231,275)(H,232,262)(H,247,248)(H,249,250)(H,251,252)(H,253,254)(H,255,256)(H,257,258)(H,285,286)(H4,190,191,198)(H4,192,193,199)/t105-,106-,107-,108-,109+,110+,118-,120-,121-,122-,123-,124-,125-,126-,127-,128-,129-,130-,131-,132-,133-,134-,135-,136-,137-,152-,153-,154-,155-,156-/m0/s1; Key:DLSWIYLPEUIQAV-CIIFZSTISA-N

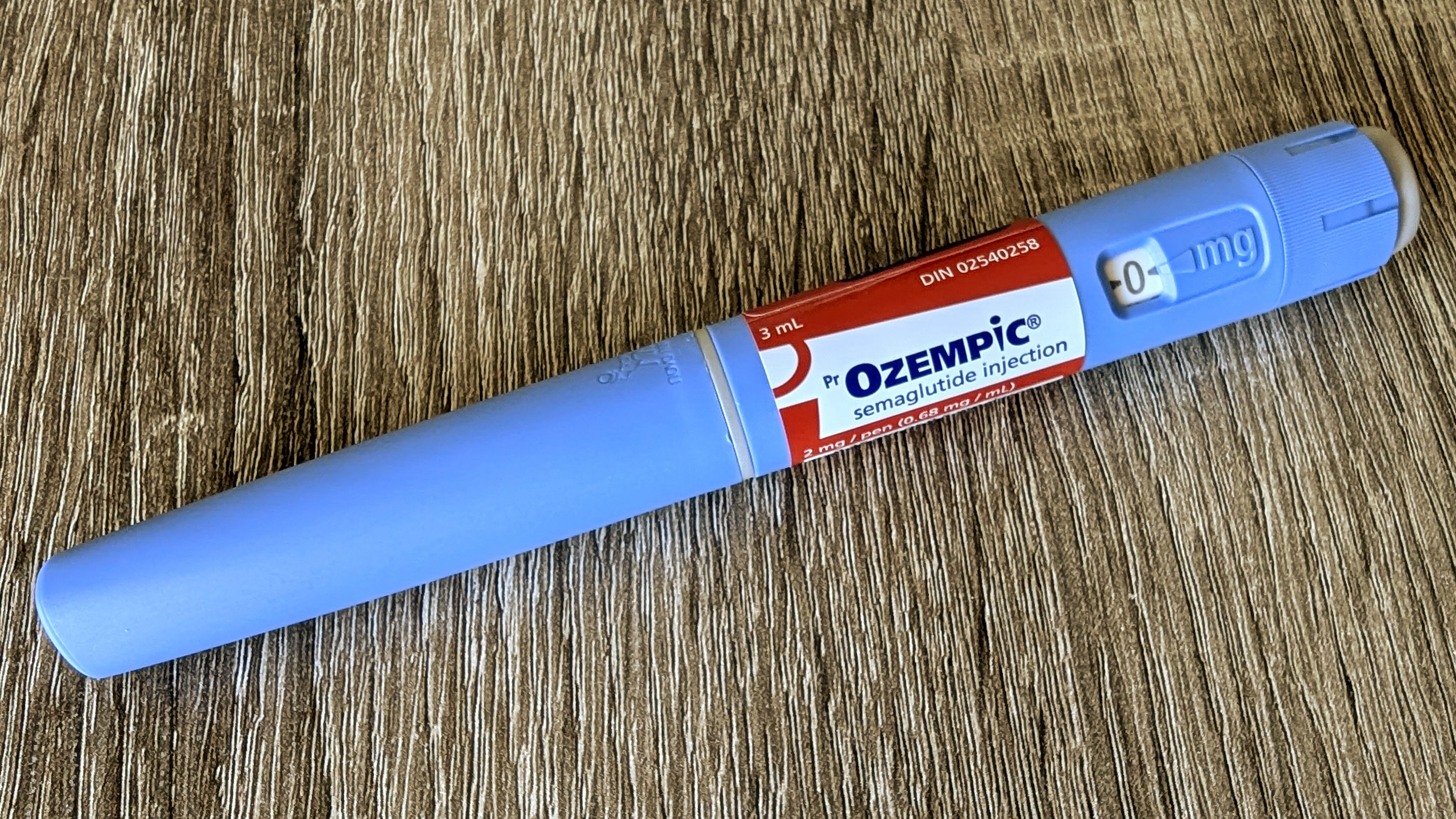
A semaglutide (Ozempic) self-injection pen

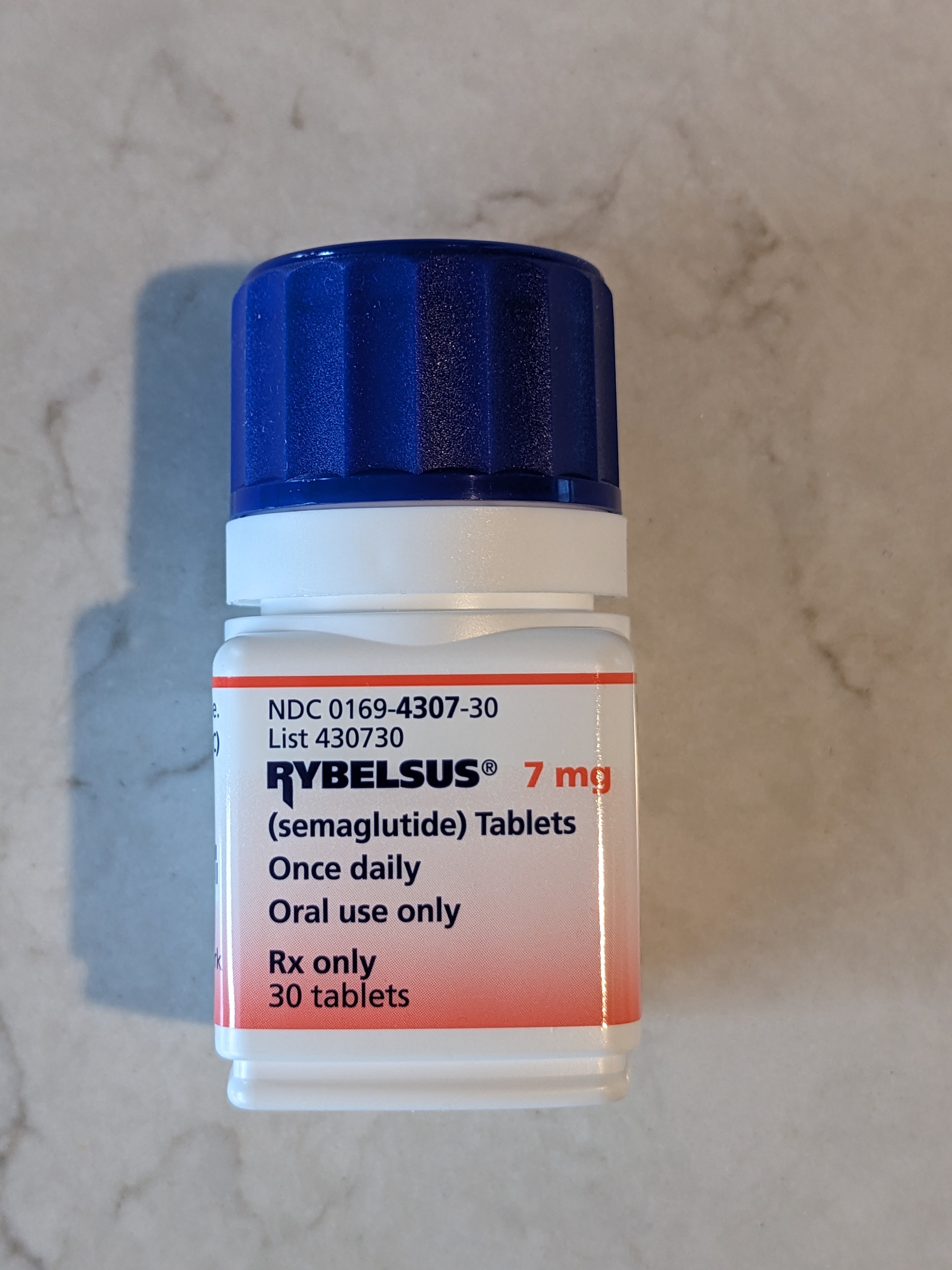
A prescription vial of semaglutide (Rybelsus) pills

Semaglutide is an anti-diabetic medication used for the treatment of type 2 diabetes, and an anti-obesity medication used for weight management. It can be administered by subcutaneous injection or taken orally. It is sold as a generic drug by several drug companies in the Indian and Canadian markets, and worldwide by its originator, Novo, under the brand names Ozempic and Rybelsus for diabetes; under the brand name Wegovy for weight management; and under the brand names Wegovy and Kayshild for the treatment of metabolic-associated steatohepatitis (nonalcoholic steatohepatitis) and liver cirrhosis. Wegovy is also used to reduce the risk of heart attacks.

Semaglutide is a peptide similar to the hormone glucagon-like peptide-1 (GLP-1), modified with a side chain, and acts as a GLP-1 receptor agonist. The most common side effects include nausea, vomiting, diarrhea, abdominal pain, and constipation.

Semaglutide was approved for medical use in the United States in 2017, in Canada, the European Union and Japan in 2018, and in Australia in 2019. In 2024, it was the fourteenth most commonly prescribed medication in the United States, with more than 40 million prescriptions. It is on the World Health Organization's List of Essential Medicines.

== Medical uses ==
=== European Union ===
In the European Union, semaglutide is indicated for the treatment of adults with insufficiently controlled type 2 diabetes as an adjunct to diet and exercise as monotherapy when metformin is considered inappropriate due to intolerance or contraindications, in addition to other medicinal products for the treatment of diabetes.

Semaglutide (as Wegovy) is further indicated as an adjunct to a reduced-calorie diet and increased physical activity for weight management, including weight loss and weight maintenance, in adults with obesity (initial BMI ≥ 30 kg/m^{2}) or who are overweight (initial BMI ≥ 27 kg/m^{2}) and have at least one weight-related comorbidity such as dysglycemia (prediabetes or type 2 diabetes), hypertension, dyslipidemia, or cardiovascular disease. It is also indicated as an adjunct to a reduced-calorie diet and increased physical activity for weight management in adolescents (aged twelve years and older) with obesity and body weight above 60 kg (130 lb).

Semaglutide (as Kayshild) is indicated in conjunction with diet and exercise for the treatment of adults with non-cirrhotic metabolic dysfunction-associated steatohepatitis (MASH) with moderate or advanced liver fibrosis (stage F2 or F3).

=== United States ===
In the United States, semaglutide is indicated as an adjunct to diet and exercise to improve glycemic control in adults with type 2 diabetes, and to reduce the risk of major adverse cardiovascular events in adults with type 2 diabetes and established cardiovascular disease.

In combination with a reduced-calorie diet and increased physical activity, semaglutide (as Wegovy) is indicated to reduce the risk of major adverse cardiovascular events (cardiovascular death, non-fatal myocardial infarction, or non-fatal stroke) in adults with established cardiovascular disease and who are either obese or overweight; to reduce excess body weight and maintain weight reduction long term in obese individuals twelve years of age or older, or for overweight adults with at least one weight-related comorbid condition.

In August 2025, the Food and Drug Administration (FDA) expanded the indication for semaglutide (as Wegovy) to include the treatment of noncirrhotic metabolic-associated steatohepatitis (MASH), formerly known as nonalcoholic steatohepatitis (NASH), with moderate to advanced liver fibrosis (consistent with stages F2 to F3 fibrosis) in adults.

In October 2025, the FDA further expanded the indication for semaglutide (as Rybelsus) to reduce the risk of major adverse cardiovascular events (cardiovascular death, non-fatal myocardial infarction, or non-fatal stroke) in adults with type 2 diabetes who are at high risk for these events.

In December 2025, the FDA approved an oral version of semaglutide for weight management, using the same brand name (Wegovy) as the injectable version.

== Contraindications ==
Semaglutide is contraindicated in people with a personal or family history of medullary thyroid carcinoma or in people with multiple endocrine neoplasia type 2.

== Adverse effects and safety profile ==
Semaglutide can cause a variety of side effects.

=== Gastrointestinal dynamics ===
The most common side effects include nausea, diarrhea, vomiting, constipation, and abdominal pain. These gastrointestinal effects are dose-dependent and mostly mild-to-moderate in severity. They are highly transient, typically peaking during the initial 8-to-12-week dose-escalation phase before waning over time. The drug delays gastric emptying, which can lead to indigestion, belching, and rarely, gastroparesis or bowel obstruction.

=== Gallbladder and biliary risk ===
Semaglutide treatment is associated with an increased risk of biliary disease, specifically gallstones (cholelithiasis). While initially thought to be solely a byproduct of rapid weight loss, the exact mechanism may involve reduced gallbladder motility and changes in bile acid composition.

=== Pancreatic and thyroid safety ===
Historically, GLP-1 receptor agonists have carried warnings regarding acute pancreatitis and pancreatic cancer. However, large-scale cardiovascular outcome trials for semaglutide have not found a statistically significant increase in the incidence of these conditions in humans.

The US prescription label contains a boxed warning for thyroid C-cell tumors. This warning is based on rodent studies; rodents possess a high density of GLP-1 receptors in their thyroid C-cells, which leads to hyperplasia and tumors when stimulated. In contrast, human thyroids express these receptors only marginally, making the risk of medullary thyroid carcinoma highly specific to rodents and clinically unlikely in humans. Semaglutide remains contraindicated in individuals with a personal or family history of medullary thyroid carcinoma or multiple endocrine neoplasia type 2.

=== Vision loss ===
Initial trials noted an increase in complications related to diabetic retinopathy. Subsequent analyses have clarified that this early worsening of pre-existing retinopathy is a secondary effect caused by the rapid and robust drop in blood glucose levels, rather than a direct toxic effect of semaglutide on the eyes.

A 2025 observational study reported a modest increased risk of a serious eye condition in people with diabetes taking glucagon-like peptide-1 (GLP-1) receptor agonists. The analysis found that individuals using the medications had a slightly higher incidence of neovascular age-related macular degeneration compared to similar individuals not on the medications.

In June 2025, the European Medicines Agency recommended that the product information for semaglutide medicines be updated to include non-arteritic anterior ischemic optic neuropathy (NAION) as a very rare side effect, while the World Health Organization concluded that the risk management plan for semaglutide should be revised to include NAION as a potential risk.

On 9 November 2026, the US Food and Drug Administration ordered that the labelling of all GLP-1 receptor agonists carry a warning about NAION, after a review of 126 randomised controlled trials covering 134,253 patients found 15 probable cases, 10 among GLP-1 users and 5 among placebo recipients, a rate of 6.4 per 100,000 patients on a GLP-1 drug against 3.8 per 100,000 in the comparison groups.

=== Additional effects ===
Semaglutide typically causes a benign increase in resting heart rate (around 3 beats per minute), which has not been associated with adverse cardiovascular events. In January 2026, the US Food and Drug Administration requested removal of suicidal behavior and ideation warning from glucagon-like peptide-1 receptor agonist (GLP-1 RA) medications.

A 2024 systematic review of 6 studies found that while lean body mass was unchanged in some cases, there were instances of significant decreases in lean body mass (0–40%). However, the review concluded that in all studies the ratio of lean body mass to total body mass increased, supporting continued use of the medication.

After stopping semaglutide, individuals on average regain 67% of the weight they lost during treatment within the following year, according to a 2025 systematic review. People return to their previous weight within a year and a half on average after stopping semaglutide.

== Social factors ==
The general public's impression of semaglutide is that it is an "easy way out" to lose weight by taking a prescription instead of altering one's lifestyle. This narrative is complicated by anthropologist Sissel Due Jensen and associates' investigation of semaglutide use in three Danish general practices. According to their findings, treatment involves more than just taking medication and losing weight. Rather, in reaction to adverse effects, financial limitations, and individual circumstances, patients and clinicians constantly "tinker" with dosage, timing, and administration. Even if treatment interferes with their daily lives, patients also put considerable effort into obtaining and maintaining access to the medication.

== Structure and pharmacology ==
A schematic representation of the structures of semaglutide and liraglutide, compared to GLP-1

Semaglutide is chemically similar to human GLP-1. The first six amino acids of GLP-1 are missing. Substitutions are made at GLP positions 8 and 34 (semaglutide positions 2 and 28), where alanine and lysine are replaced by 2-aminoisobutyric acid and arginine, respectively. The substitution of the alanine prevents chemical breakdown by dipeptidyl peptidase-4.

The lysine at GLP position 26 (semaglutide position 20) has a long chain attached, ending with a chain of 18 carbon atoms and a carboxyl group. This increases the drug's binding to blood protein (albumin), which enables longer presence in the blood circulation.

Semaglutide's half-life in the blood is about seven days (165–184 hours).

== Mechanism of action ==
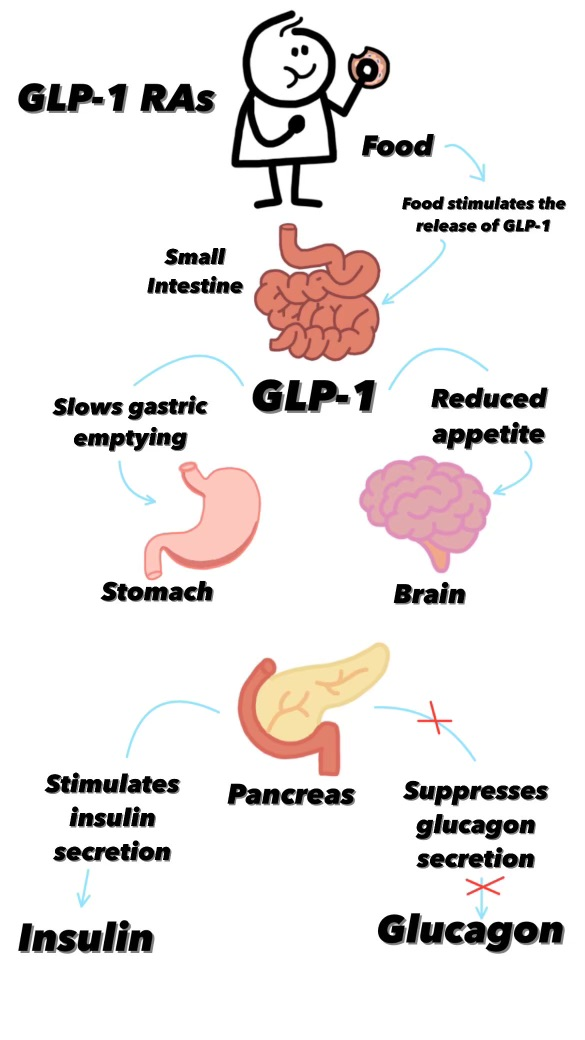
GLP-1, which semaglutide is similar to, regulates digestion and blood sugar. The small intestine releases GLP-1 when food is eaten. It reduces hunger, signals fullness, stimulates insulin, and inhibits glucagon, maintaining glucose levels.

Semaglutide is a glucagon-like peptide-1 receptor agonist. The drug mimicks the hormone glucagon-like peptide-1 (GLP-1), an incretin. This produces multiple effects on metabolic pathways:

=== Pancreatic and glycemic control ===
Semaglutide enhances the growth and proliferation of pancreatic beta cells, which are responsible for insulin production, while mitigating oxidative stress to reduce cell death (apoptosis). It achieves glycemic control primarily through a glucose-dependent mechanism: by binding to GLP-1 receptors on beta cells, it elevates intracellular levels of cyclic AMP (cAMP) and activates protein kinase A (PKA) and related signaling pathways. This cascade alters cellular energy dynamics, ultimately triggering the influx of calcium into the cell, which prompts the exocytosis (release) of insulin-containing vesicles into the bloodstream.

Concurrently, semaglutide inhibits the release of glucagon from pancreatic alpha cell, which decreases glucose production by the liver (gluconeogenesis) and maintains blood sugar level stability, particularly preventing sharp spikes after meals. Beyond its direct action on the pancreas, semaglutide alleviates peripheral insulin resistance. It does this by upregulating phosphorylated IRS-1 and activating pathways (like AMPK/SIRT1) that promote the transport of the GLUT4 glucose transporter to cell membranes in muscle and adipose tissue, thereby increasing overall cellular glucose uptake.

=== Central nervous system and appetite regulation ===
Semaglutide crosses the blood-brain barrier to interact with the arcuate nucleus of the hypothalamus, a crucial brain region for energy balance. It suppresses appetite through a dual mechanism involving hypothalamic feeding circuits. Acute administration has been shown to stimulate anorexigenic (satiety-inducing) neurons that express proopiomelanocortin (POMC) and cocaine-and amphetamine-regulated transcript (CART), while simultaneously inhibiting orexigenic (appetite-inducing) neurons that express AgRP and NPY. However, more recent evidence indicates that during chronic treatment, AgRP neurons become functionally recruited and are required for the full weight-lowering effects of GLP-1 receptor agonists in female mice, despite persistent suppression of food intake. This recruitment is associated with increased neuronal activation, synaptic remodeling, and fat utilization, suggesting that AgRP neurons contribute to the adaptive metabolic responses that sustain long-term weight loss rather than simply promoting hunger.

Furthermore, semaglutide improves the brain's sensitivity to leptin, a hormone produced by fat cells that signals satiety to the brain. In individuals with obesity, chronic low-grade inflammation often leads to "leptin resistance"—a pathological state where circulating leptin levels are high, but the brain fails to register the signal, leading to persistent hunger. Semaglutide counteracts this resistance by downregulating inhibitory proteins like SOCS3 and PTP1B. This downregulation restores normal leptin signaling pathways (such as the JAK/STAT cascade), effectively re-establishing proper appetite control and reducing energy intake.

=== Adipose tissue and metabolism ===
In obesity, adipose tissue often becomes dysfunctional; as excess energy accumulates, white adipose tissue (WAT) cells undergo abnormal, hypertrophic growth, leading to poor blood supply (hypoxia), macrophage infiltration, and systemic inflammation. This dysfunctional state limits the tissue's ability to safely store lipids and decreases the baseline activity of critical metabolic regulators like AMPK.

Semaglutide acts on these alterations by mitigating adipocyte hypertrophy and limiting excessive lipid storage through the downregulation of lipogenic enzymes such as lipoprotein lipase (LPL) and ANGPTL4. More significantly, it influences fat metabolism by promoting the "browning" of energy-storing white adipose tissue into energy-burning brown adipose tissue (BAT). It achieves this by activating the AMPK and SIRT1 pathways, which in turn upregulates the expression of uncoupling protein 1 (UCP1). This biochemical cascade increases mitochondrial thermogenesis, effectively forcing the body to dissipate excess calories as heat and increasing overall energy expenditure.

=== Inflammation and oxidative stress ===
In metabolic conditions like obesity and diabetes, chronic inflammation and oxidative stress drive cellular damage and insulin resistance. Semaglutide exhibits potent systemic anti-inflammatory and antioxidant properties by modulating the SIRT1 and NRF2 signaling pathways. This activation reduces the production of reactive oxygen species (ROS) and mitigates endoplasmic reticulum (ER) stress. Furthermore, semaglutide actively inhibits pro-inflammatory transcription factors such as NF-κB and JNK. In adipose tissue, it significantly decreases the infiltration of macrophages and suppresses the expression of neutrophil inflammatory factors like S100A8, S100A9, and CXCL2. Consequently, this lowers the systemic release of inflammatory cytokines like IL-6 and TNF-α. In macrophages derived from human monocytic cell lines, semaglutide provides direct anti-inflammatory action by attenuating LPS/IFN-γ-induced inflammatory polarization and promoting a shift toward a less inflammatory phenotype

=== Cellular aging and autophagy ===
Pathological aging and metabolic diseases are often characterized by defective mitochondria, the accumulation of misfolded proteins, and cellular senescence. Senescent cells secrete a harmful mix of inflammatory molecules known as the senescence-associated secretory phenotype (SASP). Preclinical studies suggest semaglutide counteracts these processes by activating the AMPK and SIRT1 pathways, which are fundamental for cellular autophagy and mitophagy. By upregulating proteins like parkin and TFEB, semaglutide enhances the clearance of damaged organelles. Additionally, by blockading FOXO transcription factors and NF-κB, the drug modulates SASP and upregulates anti-apoptotic proteins (such as Bcl-2), potentially delaying tissue degeneration and offering anti-aging benefits.

=== Immune modulation and infection ===
Semaglutide appears to influence the immune system through a complex gut-brain-immune network. The activation of central neuronal GLP-1 receptors by semaglutide signals through the endogenous opioid and adrenergic systems to suppress peripheral inflammation. In conditions like obesity, compromised gut barriers can allow bacterial lipopolysaccharides (LPS, or endotoxins) to enter the bloodstream, triggering severe immune responses via TLR4 receptors. Semaglutide blunts this LPS-induced release of pro-inflammatory cytokines. Moreover, in animal models of polymicrobial sepsis, semaglutide has been shown to decrease bacterial loads in multiple organs and promote the homeostasis of immunoregulatory regulatory T cells (Tregs) via the activation of FOXP3.

== Manufacturing ==
Semaglutide has been approved in biologically and chemically synthesized forms. Approval of the original brand-name versions (such as Ozempic) was based on a biologic (recombinant DNA) production process using a genetically-modified yeast (Saccharomyces cerevisiae) to produce a precursor to semaglutide, and subsequent chemical processes (protein purification) to create the active ingredient. Approval of generic versions has instead been based on fully chemical syntheses that yield the same semaglutide molecule from the assembly of amino acids.

Compounded drug versions of semaglutide have been created and made widely available, albeit without approval.

== History and clinical trials ==
In the 1970s, Jens Juul Holst and Joel Habener began research on GLP-1, initially in relation to duodenal ulcer disease. They were examining hormones secreted during eating, and testing them on pig pancreases, leading to the discovery of GLP-1's significant effects in 1988. Their work, which later contributed significantly to diabetes and obesity treatments, earned them and Daniel J. Drucker the 2020 Warren Alpert Foundation Prize.

Research continued, and in 1993, Michael Nauck managed to infuse GLP-1 into people with type 2 diabetes, stimulating insulin while inhibiting glucagon and bringing blood glucose to normal levels. However, treating diabetes with GLP-1 hormones resulted in significant side effects, leading researchers financed by Novo to start looking to develop a suitable compound for therapeutic use. In 1998, a team of researchers at Novo led by Lotte Bjerre Knudsen developed liraglutide, a GLP-1 receptor agonist that could be used to treat diabetes. This was followed by the development of semaglutide by a team of researchers at Novo, including Jesper Lau, Thomas Kruse, and Paw Bloch.

=== Clinical trials and early approvals for diabetes ===
In June 2008, a phase II clinical trial began studying semaglutide, a once-weekly diabetes therapy as a longer-acting alternative to liraglutide. It was given the brand name Ozempic. Clinical trials started in January 2016 and ended in May 2017.

The US Food and Drug Administration (FDA) approved semaglutide based on evidence from seven clinical trials of 4087 participants with type 2 diabetes. The trials were conducted at 536 sites in 33 countries, including Canada, Mexico, Russia, Ukraine, Turkey, India, South Africa, Japan, Hong Kong, multiple European countries, Argentina, and the United States. In two of these trials (NCT02054897 and NCT02305381), participants were randomly assigned to receive either semaglutide or placebo injection weekly. Neither the participant nor the health care provider knew which treatment was being given until after the trials were completed. Treatment was given for 30 weeks. In the other five trials (NCT01930188, NCT01885208, NCT02128932, NCT02207374, and NCT02254291), participants were randomly assigned to receive either semaglutide or another anti-diabetic medication, and the participant and provider knew which medication was being given in four trials. Treatment was given for 30 weeks or 56 weeks. In each trial, HbA1c was measured from the start of the trial to the end of the trial and compared between the semaglutide group and the other groups.

The FDA also considered data from one separate trial (NCT01720446), which was sponsored by Novo, of 3297 participants with type 2 diabetes who were at high risk for cardiovascular events. This trial was conducted in 20 countries: multiple European countries, Russia, Turkey, Brazil, Israel, Malaysia, Mexico, Thailand, Taiwan, Canada, and the United States. The participants were randomly assigned to receive semaglutide or placebo. Neither the participant nor the health care provider knew which treatment was being given. Treatment was given for 104 weeks (2 years), and the occurrence of cardiovascular events, including heart attacks, strokes, and hospitalization due to unstable angina (near heart attack) were recorded and compared in the two groups of participants.

=== Trials for obesity ===
In March 2021, in a phase III randomized, double-blind trial, 1,961 adults with a body mass index of 30 or greater were assigned in a 2:1 ratio to a treatment with once-weekly subcutaneous semaglutide or placebo, plus lifestyle intervention. The trials occurred at 129 sites in 16 countries in Asia, Europe, North America, and South America. The mean percentage change in body weight at week 68 was −14.9% in the semaglutide group vs −2.4% with placebo, for an estimated treatment difference of −12.4 percentage points (95% CI, −13.4 to −11.5).

A 2022 review of anti-obesity treatments found that semaglutide as well as tirzepatide (which has an overlapping mechanism of action) were more promising than previous anti-obesity drugs, although less effective than bariatric surgery.

=== Trials for cardiovascular health ===
In March 2024, the US Food and Drug Administration expanded the indication for semaglutide (brand name Wegovy) to reduce the risk of cardiovascular death, heart attack, and stroke in adults with cardiovascular disease and who are either obese or overweight. This was based on a placebo-controlled randomized double-blind trial, which was sponsored by Novo, on the efficacy and safety of semaglutide for this indication. 17,604 participant were randomly assigned to receive either semaglutide (Wegovy) or placebo. Participants in both groups also received standard-of-care medical treatment (e.g., management of blood pressure and cholesterol) and healthy lifestyle counseling (including diet and physical activity). The trial reported cumulative occurrence of major adverse cardiovascular events, a primary end-point event of the trial, for 569 of the 8803 patients in the semaglutide group, which were 6.5% of the participants, and for 701 of the 8801 patients in the placebo group, which were 8% of the participants, showing relative 18.8% less major adverse cardiovascular events, such as death from cardiovascular causes, nonfatal myocardial infarction, or nonfatal stroke, occurring for participants who had received semaglutide in the trial relative to those who had received placebo over the course of around 48 months, or 34.2±13.7 months, which was the mean (±SD) total duration of the participants in either group's exposure to the placebo or semaglutide during the trial.

== Society and culture ==
Research has explored how people understand weight-loss drugs, including semaglutide, and how pharmaceutical approaches to weight management interact with existing ideas about health and personal responsibility. Jackson conducted more than 100 hours of ethnographic observation at WeightWatchers meetings and 20 interviews with members about their views on weight-loss drugs.

The study found that some participants chose not to use these medications despite wanting to lose weight and generally supporting biomedical approaches to health.

Participants instead described preferences for slower, socially supported approaches that emphasised self-discipline, personal transformation and developing the ability to manage their own health. Others viewed pharmaceutical interventions as burdensome or risky. Jackson also found that these views varied according to social factors including race, gender, class and age.

The study describes the active rejection of weight-loss drugs as “agentic disengagement” and argues that this can represent a form of “stratified biomedicalisation”. In this context, biomedicalisation does not necessarily involve the straightforward adoption of medical treatment; people can actively negotiate whether particular pharmaceutical interventions fit their understandings of health and appropriate weight management.

Earlier ethnographic research on weight-loss medication similarly found that users could develop expertise around managing their bodies and treatment while continuing to understand overweight through a biomedical framework.

=== Legal status ===
In December 2016, a new drug application was filed with the US Food and Drug Administration (FDA), and in October 2017, an FDA advisory committee approved it unanimously. In December 2017, the injectable version with the brand name Ozempic was approved in the US for use by people with diabetes, and, in January 2018, in Canada. In February 2018, authorization was granted in the European Union, in March 2018 in Japan, and in August 2019 in Australia.

A version of semaglutide to treat diabetes that can be taken orally (Rybelsus) was approved for medical use in the US in September 2019, and in the European Union in April 2020. In January 2023, the US FDA prescription label for Rybelsus was updated to reflect that it can be used as a first-line treatment for adults with type 2 diabetes.

In June 2021, a higher-dose version for injectable use, sold under the brand name Wegovy, was approved by the FDA as an anti-obesity medication for long-term weight management in adults. In January 2022, Wegovy was approved for medical use in the European Union.

In December 2025, an oral version of semaglutide, sold under the brand name Wegovy, was approved in the US for weight management.

In March 2026, the CHMP recommended granting a conditional marketing authorization for Kayshild (semaglutide), a GLP-1 receptor agonist for the treatment of non-cirrhotic metabolic dysfunction-associated steatohepatitis (MASH) with liver fibrosis, a serious disease where fat deposits accumulate in the liver causing inflammation. There are several GLP-1 receptor agonists approved in the EU to treat diabetes and weight management. Kayshild is the first GLP-1 medicine approved for this indication.

In May 2026, the CHMP adopted a positive opinion, recommending a change to the terms of the marketing authorization for the medicinal product Wegovy. The marketing authorization holder for this medicinal product is Novo. The CHMP adopted a new pharmaceutical form associated with a new route of administration, tablets for oral use, in four new strengths (1.5 mg, 4 mg, 9 mg and 25 mg).

=== Generics and copies ===
Generic semaglutide can be legally offered following regulatory approvals in India, Canada, and Brazil.

==== Brazil ====
In Brazil, the supreme court refused to extend semaglutide's patent protection, which expired in March 2026. The first generic semaglutide injection approved by the regulator Anvisa was EMS's Ozivy on 26 May 2026. As of that date, there were 5 other synthetic semaglutide products and 1 biological one being reviewed by Anvisa. Hypera plans to offer its own generic semaglutide in the Brazilian market in 2026, and Biomm announced an agreement to offer Biocon's generic.

==== Canada ====
Semaglutide's pharmaceutical data exclusivity period expired in Canada in January 2026. Novo failed to pay a required patent maintenance fee, and their patent on the chemical structure of the drug expired in 2020. Several applications and approvals for generic semaglutide followed, both for type 2 diabetes and weight loss.

In April 2026, Dr. Reddy's Laboratories received approval to sell generic semaglutide in injectable format in Canada, having applied in February 2024. Later that week, Apotex's generic semaglutide (Apo-Semaglutide) was also approved as an injectable drug. In June 2026, Health Canada approved Sevmia, Apotex's injectable generic semaglutide for weight management in people aged 12 years and above. In July 2026, Aspen Pharmacare received approval for a generic injectable form of the drug for diabetes (Aspen-Semaglutide). Several other applications to sell generic versions have been made, but not yet approved, including by Sandoz, Taro Pharmaceuticals and Teva Pharmaceuticals. Hims & Hers Health expects to partner with an approved manufacturer to market a generic version. Sandoz' 2026 offering would be for diabetes only, while Biocon hopes to offer generic semaglutide for diabetes and weight loss by 2027.

Novo is considering competing against the new generic drugs with Plosbrio and Poviztra: additional brand names for semaglutide, but marketed at a lower price than Ozempic and Wegovy. In contrast to generics, which may be chemically synthesized versions manufactured using different processes than the original biologic drug, Health Canada confirmed that Plosbrio and Poviztra differ from the existing proprietary drugs Ozempic and Wegovy only in name and packaging, and are unrelated to the generics from a regulatory perspective.

The generic drug pricing formula is based on the number of generics on the market, as agreed to by suppliers and a purchasers' consortium called the Pan-Canadian Pharmaceutical Alliance. When 2 generics are available, their prices are set at 50% of the brand name price—and the May 2026 list price of brand-name Ozempic is $228 for 4 weeks' supply, plus retail markup.

==== India ====
Following the expiration of the semaglutide patent in India in March 2026, several domestic pharmaceutical companies launched generic versions of the drug for the treatment of type 2 diabetes and obesity. These included Sun Pharmaceutical Industries (Sematrinity and Noveltreat), Dr. Reddy's Laboratories (Obeda), Zydus Lifesciences (Alterme, Mashema and Semaglyn), Torrent Pharmaceuticals (Sembolic and Semalix), Alkem Laboratories (Semasize, Obesema and Hepaglide), Glenmark Pharmaceuticals (Glipiq) and Eris Lifesciences (Sundae). Others, including Natco Pharma (Semanat and Semafull) and Mankind Pharma also planned product launches around the same time, and in total, 40–50 total brands of semaglutide were expected to become available in India in the following months.

==== China ====
The Chinese patent was scheduled to expire in 2026, but a court ruled in 2022 that all patents on semaglutide were invalid "for reasons related to experimental data availability". Novo appealed the ruling and the decision was overturned by the Supreme People's Court. According to Novo, under the China–Switzerland Free Trade Agreement, semaglutide is subject to regulatory data protection in China until April 2027, and their Swiss subsidiary holds those rights exclusively.

Government records indicate that at least 15 generic versions of semaglutide are being developed for the Chinese market, both for diabetes and weight loss; 11 were in the final stages of clinical trials as of June 2024. Among others, Hangzhou Jiuyuan Gene Engineering, The United Laboratories, CSPC Pharmaceutical Group, Huadong Medicine (which also holds a majority stake in Jiuyuan Gene) and Sihuan Pharmaceutical were all preparing generic offerings.

==== United States ====
In 2026, Apotex received a tentative approval from the United States Food and Drug Administration to produce generic semaglutide. The tentative approval means that a scientific assessment of the generic drug was completed successfully, and that contracts and supply chains can be established, but that selling the drug would depend on intellectual property constraints. Semaglutide is expected to become patent-free in the United States no earlier than December 2031.

==== Other ====
Drug patents on semaglutide in Europe and Japan are expected to expire in 2031.

Dr. Reddy's has made regulatory applications in 87 countries where it plans to offer generic semaglutide in 2026 or 2027. Biocon plans to offer generic semaglutide in Mexico and Saudi Arabia.

=== Compounded versions ===
In the US, compounding pharmacies may prepare compounded versions of a drug on the Food and Drug Administration's (FDA) drug shortages list if the compounded drug meets certain conditions detailed in federal law. The FDA declared a shortage for Ozempic and Wegovy (but not Rybelsus) starting in August 2022.

As of January 2026, there were up to 1.5 million users of compounded GLP-1 drugs (including semaglutide) in the United States, according to Novo CEO Mike Doustdar.

Some compounded versions contain salts of semaglutide, including the sodium and the acetate. The FDA cautioned that formulations containing semaglutide sodium or semaglutide acetate had not yet been shown to be safe and effective, and stated that moreover, the FDA does not evaluate compounded drugs for safety and effectiveness.

The National Association of Boards of Pharmacy, a trade organization for pharmacy regulators, claims that there are tens of thousands of online pharmacies operating illegally or outside of the association's recommendations. Novo has taken legal action against several businesses that it alleges are selling unfit semaglutide products.

=== Counterfeits ===
In October 2023, there were reports of counterfeit Ozempic pens being sold in Europe. The pens possibly contained insulin, and led to several people being hospitalised with hypoglycemia and seizures. (Note: Although an insulin icodec/semaglutide combination drug named Kyinsu was authorized in Europe in 2025, this incident was not linked to that product.)

In December 2023, the US FDA issued a warning about counterfeit Ozempic.

=== Economics ===
Semaglutide had the highest earnings from sales of medications in the US in 2023, with expenditures of US$38.6 billion.

==== Cost, coverage and supply ====
In 2023, Ozempic, the semaglutide injection used for type 2 diabetes treatment, had list price of one-month supply of $936 in the US, $169 in Japan, $147 in Canada, $144 in Switzerland, $103 in Germany and the Netherlands, $96 in Sweden, $93 in the UK, and $87 in Australia; France had the lowest price at $83.

High demand caused worldwide supply shortages of semaglutide in 2023; new UK prescriptions were not issued during the shortage. Novo revealed in April 2024, that to meet the enormous demand for semaglutide, it was running its production facilities 24/7; it had budgeted $6 billion in 2024 to expand its crowded and congested facilities; and it had hired over 10,000 new employees in 2023 alone.

===== Australia =====
In Australia, semaglutide is available on the Pharmaceutical Benefits Scheme prescription for diabetes at the regular co-payment rates of $25.00, or $7.70 for concession card holders.

===== Finland =====
In Finland, semaglutide is included in the national price regulation scheme and is available by prescription. For people with type 2 diabetes and a BMI over 27, part of the cost is covered by Kela, the Finnish social insurance institution.

===== United Kingdom =====
In the UK, semaglutide is available on NHS prescription for diabetes at nominal or no cost to the individual. It is also available for obesity, limited to treatment for two years.

===== United States =====
In the US, Wegovy has a list price of $1,349.02 per month as of 2022, suggesting that because of the high costs many people "who could most benefit from weight loss may be unable to afford such expensive drugs". High costs of Ozempic prompted some insurance companies to investigate and refuse to cover individuals with what the companies considered was insufficient evidence to support a diabetes diagnosis, alleging off-label prescribing for weight loss.

In April 2025, the Trump Administration declined to finalize a proposal from the Biden Administration that would have required Medicare, Medicaid, and CHIP to broadly cover GLP-1s for weight loss. Despite the rejection, CMS has indicated that it might cover obesity medication in future rulemaking. However, in November 2025, the Trump Administration announced TrumpRx, an initiative similar to GoodRx, to lower the price of GLP-1s to $245 per month for patients covered by Medicaid and CHIP and $50 month for Medicare patients if states opted in.

In November 2025, the United States President Donald Trump announced a deal with Novo to lower the costs of Ozempic, including monthly prices of about $245 for injectables and $149 for some oral versions for people on Medicare and Medicaid and for those who use his TrumpRx platform.

Novo announced in February 2026, that effective January 2027, the list price of Wegovy, Ozempic, and Rybelsus would drop to $675/month.

Coverage for people with obesity and at least one comorbidity like (elevated LDL-cholesterol, high blood pressure and/or MASLD), will be implemented as early as 1 April 2026. The cost will be significantly higher to taxpayers due to the fact that most insurance companies do not cover it in their formulary. Prior to this change, most Medicaid and CHIP patients only paid $3 a month, the same price for brand-name medication.

In May 2026, Amazon Pharmacy announced that it would provide same‑day prescription delivery for the Ozempic pill, used to treat type 2 diabetes.

==== Economic impact on Denmark ====
By 2023, Novo was the most valuable corporation in the European Union, worth more than US$500 billion, and accounted for almost all economic growth in Denmark. The large amounts of foreign currency earned by Novo from Wegovy and Ozempic sales, when converted to Danish krone, have exerted upward pressure on the value of the krone, making it necessary for Danmarks Nationalbank to maintain lower interest rates than the European Central Bank. Poor clinical trial results published by Novo in December 2024 contributed to a drop in the krone's value.

Profits from Novo result in increased Danish tax revenues and employment. Novo added 3,500 jobs in Denmark in 2022, bringing the total in the country to 21,000 employees, out of 59,000 worldwide.

As of February 2026, Novo has a market capitalization of $220.42 billion.

== Research and emerging applications ==
A 2014 meta-analysis found that semaglutide may be effective in lowering liver enzymes (transaminitis) and improving certain radiologically observed features of metabolic dysfunction–associated steatotic liver disease. The French national health care insurance system database had previously suggested that one to three years of use of glucagon-like peptide-1 receptor agonists like exenatide, liraglutide, and dulaglutide may be linked with increased occurrence of thyroid cancer. Semaglutide belongs to the same family of medicine. A meta-analysis involving data from 37 randomized controlled trials and 19 real-world studies (46,719 individuals) showed that semaglutide use over 18 months was not associated with increased risk of any cancer, supported by high-quality evidence.

In March 2023, a Novo official said, based on a randomized, double-blind study (NCT03548935) funded by the company, that people using semaglutide to lose weight regained two-thirds of their original weight loss one year (52 weeks) after discontinuing use of the drug. After two years (120 weeks), the patients retained roughly one-third of their original weight loss (5.6% of the original 17.3% loss).

In July 2023, the Icelandic Medicines Agency reported two cases of suicidal thoughts and one case of self-injury of users of the injection, prompting a safety assessment of Ozempic, Wegovy, Saxenda, and similar drugs. In January 2024, a preliminary review conducted by the US Food and Drug Administration (FDA) confirmed no evidence had been found to suggest that the medicine causes suicidal thoughts or actions.

In the STEP-HFpEF trial including people with obesity and heart failure with preserved ejection fraction, weight loss was associated with improvements in heart failure symptoms and functional capacity. An observational study on people with obesity and type 2 diabetes and heart failure with preserved ejection fraction, semaglutide had about a 42% lower risk of hospitalization for heart failure and all-cause death combined compared with sitagliptin.

An analysis of events in the US FDA Adverse Event Reporting System suggests an association between several GLP-1 agonists (including semaglutide) and cutaneous reactions, such as dermal hypersensitivity reactions, eosinophilic panniculitis, bullous pemphigoid, and morbilliform drug eruptions.

In August 2026, a post hoc analysis of the SELECT phase 3 trial involving adults aged 65 and older without diabetes revealed that 104 weeks of semaglutide treatment slowed the progression of a validated 25-protein blood signature (Dementia SomaSignal Test) predicting long-term all-cause dementia risk. Participants receiving semaglutide experienced a 26% lower predicted 5-year dementia risk compared to placebo, with the majority of the protective association persisting independent of weight loss alone.
