= Lotte Bjerre Knudsen =

Danish scientist (born 1964)

- Born: Lotte Bjerre Knudsen; 10 March 1964 (age 62); Ringsted, Denmark
- Known for: Contributions to liraglutide and semaglutide development
- Scientific career
- Workplaces: Novo

Lotte Bjerre Knudsen (born 10 March 1964) is a Danish scientist and university professor. She led the development of liraglutide and oversaw the development of semaglutide, two notable drugs approved for indications in the treatment of diabetes and obesity.

== Early life and education ==
Knudsen originally studied chemical engineering at the Technical University of Denmark, and obtained a doctorate in scientific medicine (DMSc) from the University of Copenhagen in 2014.

== Career ==
Knudsen began work as a scientist at the pharmaceutical company Novo in Denmark in 1989. As of December 2015, she was being referred to as Scientific Vice President for Global Research at Novo. She served as an adjunct faculty member at Aarhus University from 2015–2020, as a professor in translational medicine.

Knudsen has been employed as a Chief Scientific Advisor in Research and Early Development at Novo.

== Contributions ==
While still a student, Knudsen worked at Novo, initially working on laundry detergent enzymes. Alongside fellow student Shamkant Patkar, she discovered an enzyme capable of removing microscopic strands of cotton that pill up on clothing from repeated wear.

After this project, Knudsen joined full-time as part of a research group at Novo that aimed to identify new treatments for diabetes, by developing small molecule drugs targeting specific metabolic pathways. One project revolved around glucagon-like peptide-1 (GLP-1), a hormone that stimulates the production of insulin but has a short half-life of minutes in the body.

GLP-1 had been previously identified by researchers such as Jens Juul Holst in Denmark, who joined Novo as a consultant, and Joel Habener, Daniel J. Drucker, and Svetlana Mojsov at Massachusetts General Hospital. Knudsen's team screened numerous chemical compounds to identify whether they could bind to the GLP-1 receptor sufficiently to stimulate insulin secretion.

Eventually, they developed a new compound called liraglutide, which is an agonist for the GLP-1 receptor. It is a chemical analogue of GLP-1, with a fatty acid and spacer attached. These modifications increased its ability to dissolve in water and bind to albumin, which increase its bioavailability—its lifetime in the bloodstream, and so the duration of its action in the body. Liraglutide was approved as a treatment for diabetes under the brand name Victoza in the United States in 2010.

Knudsen's team, specifically Jesper Lau and Thomas Kruse, then worked on what became semaglutide, which had greater stability and affinity to albumin, lengthening its duration of action further to a once-weekly drug.

Semaglutide was approved in the United States under the brand name Ozempic as a treatment for type 2 diabetes in 2017, and under the brand name Wegovy, as a first injectable (at 2.4 mg once weekly), for chronic weight management in June 2021. In January 2025, the FDA approved a pill form of Wegovy with doses ranging from 1.5 mg to 25 mg.

== Impact ==
Martin Müller and Alexander Preker, writing for Der Spiegel in January 2024, have referred to Knudsen discovery in inventing the semaglutide weight-loss injections as "revolutionary", with the "drug Wegovy... [having] changed the world", and having made Novo "Europe's most valuable company, with a greater market capitalization than Daimler, Bayer, Lufthansa and BMW combined."

In the initial clinical trials for Wegovy, diabetics lost more than 10% of their weight and in trials for weight loss, patients lost an average of 12.4% of their weight. Additional patient benefits included reduction of cardiovascular events by 26%, and benefits to patients with heart and kidney failure. The GLP receptor agonists have reformed treatment outcomes for obesity and diabetes "with profound implications for maintaining human health."

== Honors and recognition ==
Knudsen received the 2023 Paul Langerhans Medal by the German Diabetes Society for her work developing liraglutide. In October 2023, she received the STAT Biomedical Innovation award, and in 2024, she received the Mani L. Bhaumik Breakthrough of the Year Award. In 2024 she received the Lasker Award in clinical research. In 2024, Knudsen received the Golden Plate Award of the American Academy of Achievement, presented by Awards Council member Robert S. Langer. In 2025, Knudsen received the 2025 Breakthrough Prize in Life Sciences.
