= Daniel Drucker =

Daniel Drucker may refer to:

- Daniel J. Drucker (born 1956), professor of medicine
- Daniel C. Drucker (1918–2001), mechanical engineer
