= Glycemia =

Glycemia is the presence or level of glucose in the blood. Derived words include:

- Dysglycemia, an abnormal level of glucose in the blood
  - Aglycemia, the absence of glucose in the blood
  - Hyperglycemia, an abnormally high level of glucose in the blood
  - Hypoglycemia, an abnormally low level of glucose in the blood
- Euglycemia or normoglycemia, a normal level of glucose in the blood
- Glycemic, relating to glycemia
