= Arne Astrup =

Danish physician and physiologist (born 1955)

Arne Vernon Astrup
- Born: 1 August 1955 (age 71); Frederiksberg, Denmark
- Education: University of Copenhagen
- Known for: Nutrition and obesity research; collaborative human studies of GLP-1 as a satiety hormone (with Jens Juul Holst); work of the Danish Nutrition Council, which he chaired, preceding Denmark's 2003 trans fat regulation
- Awards: Knight of the Order of the Dannebrog (1999); Knight of the Order of the Dannebrog, First Class (2012); named a Highly Cited Researcher by Clarivate Analytics (2018); George Bray Outstanding Scientific Achievements Award in Obesity Research, American Society for Nutrition (2024)
- Scientific career
- Fields: Author; Medical doctor; Internal medicine; Researcher; Nutrition; Obesity; Glucagon-like peptides (GLP-1)
- Workplaces: University of Copenhagen (1990–2020); Novo Nordisk Foundation (2020–2025); Eolo Pharma, board member (2025–present); Copenhagen University Hospital – Bispebjerg and Frederiksberg, senior consultant

Arne Vernon Astrup (born 1 August, in Frederiksberg, 1955) is a Danish nutritionist, chief physician, researcher, author and professor. He is known as a researcher, communicator and author and has published more than 950 scientific articles. In 2018 he was internationally recognised as Highly Cited Researcher by Clarivate Analytics, a distinction awarded to researchers whose papers rank in the top 1 percent by citations for their field and publication year. In 2024 he received the American Society for Nutrition's George Bray Outstanding Scientific Achievements Award in Obesity Research, which recognises a significant lifetime contribution to the field.

Astrup's research group developed and validated methods for assessing appetite and food intake in humans, including visual analogue scales for subjective appetite sensations. In 1998, a study carried out at the Research Department of Human Nutrition at the Royal Veterinary and Agricultural University in collaboration with Jens Juul Holst of the University of Copenhagen reported that intravenous infusion of GLP-1 increased satiety and reduced food intake in healthy men, and concluded that GLP-1 may play a physiological role in regulating appetite and energy intake in humans. An independent review of GLP-1 research cites the study as early human evidence that GLP-1 reduces appetite and food intake, a finding linked to the later development of GLP-1 receptor agonists for obesity.

Astrup was also a named co-inventor, with Holst and four other named inventors, on a 1996 patent application filed by Novo Nordisk concerning the use of GLP-1 peptides to suppress appetite or induce satiety. He has described this research as part of the scientific rationale for later GLP-1-based obesity medicines, including Novo Nordisk's semaglutide products marketed as Ozempic and Wegovy.

From 1990 to 2020 he was head of the Department of Nutrition, Exercise and Sports at the Faculty of Science at the University of Copenhagen. In the fall of 2016, the department was ranked by the internationally recognised Shanghai Ranking as the world's leading research environment in its field. From 2020 to 2025 he was Senior Vice President, a, Obesity and Nutritional Sciences, at the Novo Nordisk Foundation. He left the foundation on 1 August 2025. Since then he has been an independent consultant and a board member of several international companies, including Eolo Pharma. He was also a member of the board of the Centre for Childhood Health, to which he was appointed by the Novo Nordisk Foundation. He is a senior consultant at Copenhagen University Hospital – Bispebjerg and Frederiksberg, where he was earlier chief consultant at the unit for clinical nutrition research.

== Education and early career ==
Astrup completed his medical studies at the University of Copenhagen in 1981. In 1986, he received his medical doctorate (Dr. med.) for his dissertation on metabolism in humans. Subsequently, he continued his training as a specialist in Internal medicine. He was at the final stage of his specialist training when he became head of the Danish Royal Veterinary and Agricultural University in 1990.

== Career and recognitions ==
Arne Astrup has achieved national and international recognition since the 1990s. He is known for being one of the most cited researchers in the world. His work in the intersection between industry and academia has resulted in several controversies that have made his name publicly known in the wider Danish population.

=== Recognitions ===
- Public attention: In the 1990s, Arne Astrup gained public attention due to his new methods for measuring appetite and energy intake.
- Chairman of the National Nutrition Council (1992 to 2003): The council published a series of reports on the health risks of industrially produced trans fats between 1994 and 2003, and in 2003 the Danish government introduced a regulation limiting industrially produced trans fats in foods, making Denmark the first country to do so; Astrup chaired the council during this period.
- Academically active for 30 years: During an academic career spanning 30 years, Arne Astrup has primarily focused on research in appetite regulation, treatment of obesity, type 2 diabetes, cardiovascular diseases, and other conditions where nutrition and physical activity are significant.
- GLP-1 as a satiety hormone: In 1996, together with Jens Juul Holst, he identified GLP-1 as a satiety hormone, leading to a patent that helped Novo Nordisk A/S develop GLP-1 analogs for severe obesity.
- World Obesity Federation: Astrup was president of the World Obesity Federation for four years (formerly The International Association for the Study of Obesity (IASO)).
- Director of the Nordea Foundation OPUS Research Centre (2009 to 2013): A University of Copenhagen research programme examining the New Nordic Diet — a diet based on regional Nordic foods — and its effects on health, acceptability and sustainability. In this role Astrup directed the centre's research programme, including studies on the diet's nutrient composition and its effects on weight and cardiometabolic risk factors.
- Obesity Reviews: Arne Astrup was the founding editor-in-chief of the English journal Obesity Reviews (from 1999 to 2010).
- American Journal of Clinical Nutrition: Editor of the American Journal of Clinical Nutrition since 2010.
- Shanghai Rankings: Under his leadership, the Department of Sports and Nutrition at the University of Copenhagen was recognised as the world's leading institution in sports research by the Shanghai Ranking in 2018.
- 900+ scientific articles: He has published more than 900 peer-reviewed scientific articles and over 1000 other academic texts, including abstracts, textbook chapters, and scientific letters.
- Among the world's most cited: Arne Astrup is internationally recognised as one of the world's most cited researchers. He was named a Highly Cited Researcher by Clarivate Analytics (Web of Science) in 2018, a distinction awarded to researchers with multiple papers ranking in the top 1 percent by citations for their field and publication year over the preceding decade.
- Knight of the Order of the Dannebrog: Knight of the Order of the Dannebrog in 1999, and Knight 1st Class of the Order of the Dannebrog in 2012.
- Recipient of the American Society for Nutrition's George Bray Outstanding Scientific Achievements Award in Obesity Research (2024): Presented for a significant lifetime contribution to obesity research; he delivered the award lecture at the society's NUTRITION 2024 meeting in Chicago.
- Principal investigator or co-investigator on numerous randomized controlled trials on appetite regulation and obesity conducted at the University of Copenhagen and its predecessor institution, the Royal Veterinary and Agricultural University. These include the 1998 human GLP-1 infusion study discussed below and the multi-centre, pan-European DiOGenes trial, which examined the effect of dietary protein and glycaemic index on weight-loss maintenance across eight European countries.
- Astrup was listed as the responsible party, as registered with ClinicalTrials.gov, for a randomized, double-blind, controlled trial examining the effect of a high intake of industrially produced trans fatty acids on abdominal and liver fat deposition and blood lipids in overweight postmenopausal women, published as Bendsen NT, et al., "Effect of trans fatty acid intake on abdominal and liver fat deposition and blood lipids: a randomized trial in overweight postmenopausal women," Nutrition & Diabetes, 2011, volume 1, article e4, registered as ClinicalTrials.gov NCT00655902.

== Arne Astrup's research ==
Arne Astrup has a background in nutrition research, where he has worked with both experimental physiological and biochemical research as well as clinical treatment trials with subjects and patients. His scientific work has contributed to the understanding of human appetite regulation and energy metabolism, which has led to insights into adipose tissue deposition and body weight.

== GLP-1 as a satiety hormone in humans ==
In collaboration with Professor Jens Juul Holst, he discovered that GLP-1 acts as a satiety hormone in humans. This discovery has played a key role in the development of GLP-1 drugs for the treatment of obesity, which has contributed to the success of Novo Nordisk A/S and their drug Wegovy. Astrup, together with Holst, Anne Flint and Anne Raben, subsequently investigated GLP-1's effects on appetite and food intake in humans. In a placebo-controlled, randomized, blinded crossover study, 20 healthy men received intravenous infusions of synthetic GLP-1 or saline; GLP-1 infusion increased subjective satiety and reduced spontaneous energy intake at a subsequent ad libitum lunch by approximately 12 percent compared with placebo. The authors' affiliations show the work as a collaboration between two Copenhagen research groups: Flint, Raben and Astrup were based at the Research Department of Human Nutrition at the Royal Veterinary and Agricultural University in Frederiksberg, while Holst, a physiologist specialising in gut hormones, was based at the Department of Medical Physiology at the University of Copenhagen's Panum Institute. Astrup writes that the study's test meals were prepared and the feeding trial was conducted in his department, that Holst contributed expertise in GLP-1 physiology and hormone measurement, and that the body of work involved the scientists, dietitians and technicians of his own department together with collaborating scientists from other laboratories, including Holst. The 1998 paper's funding acknowledgment states that the study was supported by the Danish Research and Development Program for Food Technology and the Danish Medical Research Council, and that Holst's contribution was separately supported by the Danish Biotechnology Program.

Flint and Raben were, at the time, Astrup's PhD student and postdoctoral researcher respectively; Astrup has credited them, together with other former PhD students and postdocs in his department, for their contributions to this and related research. The study built on methodology the group had been developing over the preceding years, including a visual analogue scale (VAS) protocol for measuring subjective appetite that Astrup, Flint, Raben and John Blundell had validated in an earlier study, and Astrup has separately acknowledged the department's dietitians and kitchen staff, who prepared the standardized test meals used in these studies.

Astrup has written that he and Holst first discussed, in 1994, the idea that GLP-1 might also mediate meal-induced satiety, and jointly designed the study that followed; he has described it as the first study to demonstrate a physiological role for GLP-1 in appetite regulation and energy intake in humans. Other groups reported human GLP-1 infusion studies on food intake in the same period, with differing results, which Astrup attributes partly to limited statistical power and low infusion rates. [9] A later review of the GLP-1 field describes the 1998 infusion study among the human findings linking GLP-1 to reduced food intake, a link that led to the development and approval of the first GLP-1 receptor agonist for obesity. Journalist Ole Hall's 2026 history of Novo Nordisk describes Astrup's laboratory as having hosted one of the early human GLP-1 experiments in Denmark in the 1990s, and presents accounts of the research from both Astrup and Holst.

The development of longer-acting GLP-1 analogues suitable for clinical use, and their formulation into approved medicines such as liraglutide and semaglutide, was carried out over the following two decades by pharmaceutical researchers at Novo Nordisk and other companies.

Arne Astrup has published numerous scientific articles in recognized international journals such as The Lancet, British Medical Journal, Nature and New England Journal of Medicine. In 2018, he was included in the Web of Science list of the world's most cited scientists.

Throughout his career Astrup has also been a dedicated supervisor for 42 PhD students and has contributed to research through an interdisciplinary perspective since his student days.

== Patent ==
On 12 November 1996, Novo Nordisk A/S filed a priority patent application titled "Use of GLP-1 Peptides," naming Arne Vernon Astrup, Jens Juul Holst, Liselotte Bjerre Knudsen, Lars Thim, Martin Edward Judge and Birgitte Schjellerup Wulff as inventors. The application was published internationally as WO1998020895A1 and granted in Europe as EP0941114B1. It claimed the use of GLP-1(1-45), or an analogue or fragment thereof, in the preparation of a medicament for peripheral administration to suppress appetite or induce satiety. Astrup has written that he receives no royalty or other payments from this patent.

=== Activity ===
Despite being a department head for decades and hence not expected to be actively researching, Arne Astrup has published more than 900 scientific publications, as well as a number of scientific and popular science books throughout his career. As a result, in 2010 he was ranked number 5 in the international ranking of the world's most productive researchers in the field of overweight and obesity by ISIS Reuters. He is also a frequent contributor to leading medical journals such as The Lancet, New England Journal of Medicine and American Journal of Clinical Nutrition. Professionally, he is a trendsetter, which is why in 2018 he was included in Clarivate's exclusive list of the most cited researchers in the world. A list that only 32 other researchers at the University of Copenhagen have made. He has also written columns and letters to the editor in Ekstra Bladet, 24 Timer and Ude og Hjemme, among others. He has received numerous honors for his research and was appointed Knight of Dannebrog in 1991 and Knight of the Order of Dannebrog 1st degree in 2012.

Through his work as head of the Department of Human Nutrition (and since 2012 the Department of Nutrition, Exercise and Sports), Arne Astrup has had a significant influence on the development of the field of nutrition, including being the initiator of establishing the Master's programs in Human Nutrition, as well as Clinical Nutrition at the Danish Royal Veterinary and Agricultural University (since 2007 part of the University of Copenhagen).

Arne Astrup is behind the EU diet project "Diogenes", supported by the EU Framework Program with 15 million euros, which showed that a diet with more protein and fewer carbohydrates could promote weight control in overweight people after weight loss. Together with Master of Science in Human Nutrition Christian Bitz, he has disseminated the principles of Diogenes in the book "The World's Best Diet", which has sold over 100,000 copies and has been translated into 4 languages.

== Criticism and controversies ==
Astrup has faced criticism for combining his research responsibilities with personal economic interests on several occasions. For instance, he held a dual role with the company NeuroSearch, acting as an advisor and owning stocks while publicly endorsing the company's diet pill in his column, "Doktor Slank" ("Doctor Skinny"). This raised concerns about potential conflicts of interest. Following the negative publicity, Astrup sold his shares in Neurosearch, which were valued at approximately DKK 200,000. He maintains that he was able to keep his professional and personal interests separate.

=== A person who divided the public ===
In public, Arne Astrup has been controversial over the years, and as a public figure he shares the waters. Some view Arne Astrup positively and value his scientific merits and popular impact in translating complex science into easily understandable messages. Others were critical and saw him as untrustworthy, partly on the grounds that he collaborated closely with industry, and that his scientifically based messages have often been so closely aligned with the interests of those who funded his research that he could be bought to say anything.

== Career after academia ==
After eight years (2012–2020) as the head of the Department of Nutrition, Exercise and Sports at the University of Copenhagen — during which the department was ranked the world's leading research environment in its field by the Shanghai Ranking — Arne Astrup left the position on 1 July 2020 as he was appointed Senior Vice President and Head of the Obesity and Nutritional Sciences department at the Novo Nordisk Foundation where he led a national initiative on childhood obesity prevention. Arne Astrup is a member of the Foundation's Executive Leadership Team.

== Awards and honours ==
Arne Astrup has received a number of Danish and international awards throughout his career, including:

Year	Award
1990	Danish Obesity Research Award
1990	Servier's Award for Outstanding Obesity Research
1994	IASO Andrew Mayer Award
1995	Mölnlycke Life Quality Award
2002	Danone Chair in Nutrition 2002 at The University of Antwerp
2007	University of Copenhagen: Communications Award
2009	International Association of Business Communicators’ EME Excel Merit Award for Communication Leadership
2010	University of Copenhagen: Innovation Award
2010	Nutrition & Santé Weight Management Award (France)
2011	Gourmand World Cookbook Awards, Best Scandinavian Cuisine Book, for Ny Nordisk Hverdagsmad (with Claus Meyer and others)
2012	Finnish Association of Internal Medicine Esko Nikkilä Prize
2012	American Society for Nutrition Robert H. Herman Award
2012	Danish Communication Association KomPris´12 to the OPUS Research Centre
2012	Knight of the Order of the Dannebrog, First Class
2014	International Association for the Study of Obesity (IASO) Willendorf Award
2017	Royal College of Physicians of Edinburgh Sir Stanley Davidson Silver Medal
2018	Highly Cited Researcher (Clarivate Analytics / Web of Science)
2024	George Bray Outstanding Scientific Achievements Award in Obesity Research, American Society for Nutrition

== Authorship ==
Arne Astrup has published several books together with other authors such as Claus Meyer, Christian Bitz, Mads Fiil Hjorth and others.

Year	Title	Akuthors
2018	Type C – Spis dig slank efter Blodsukkerkuren	Arne Astrup, Christian Bitz, Mads Fiil Hjorth
2017	Spis dig slank efter dit blodsukker	Arne Astrup, Christian Bitz
2017	Type A – spis dig slank efter dit blodsukker	Arne Astrup, Christian Bitz, Mads Fiil Hjorth
2017	Type B – spis dig slank efter dit blodsukker	Arne Astrup, Christian Bitz, Mads Fiil Hjorth
2017	Type A – spis dig slank efter dit blodsukker	Arne Astrup, Christian Bitz, Mads Fiil Hjorth
2017	The Nordic Way	Jennie Brand-Miller, Arne Astrup, Christian Bitz
2016	Til Øllet	Arne Astrup, Erik Skovenborg
2015	Rigtig Mad	Arne Astrup, Thilde Jo Maarbjerg, Thomas Rode Andersen
2014	Verdens sundeste mor og barn	Arne Astrup, Christian Bitz
2012	Verdens Bedste Kur	Arne Astrup, Christian Bitz
2012	Verdens bedste kur vol. 2.0	Arne Astrup, Christian Bitz
2007	Spis Igennem	Arne Astrup, Claus Meyer
2004	100 spørgsmål til professoren – og 100 svar. Slankeguiden 2004	Arne Astrup
