= Michel C. Nussenzweig =

Brazilian immunologist (born 1955)

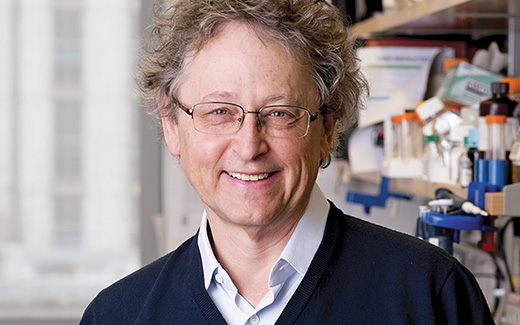
- Born: 10 February 1955 (age 71); São Paulo, Brazil
- Education: The Rockefeller University (Ph.D., 1981); New York University School of Medicine (M.D., 1982)
- Alma mater: New York University (B.A., 1975)
- Spouse: Svetlana Mojsov
- Scientific career
- Fields: Immunology; Molecular Biology
- Workplaces: The Rockefeller University

Michel C. Nussenzweig (born 10 February 1955) is a professor and head of the Laboratory of Molecular Immunology at The Rockefeller University and a Howard Hughes Medical Institute investigator. He is a member of both the US National Academy of Medicine and the US National Academy of Sciences.

== Education and career ==
Nussenzweig graduated summa cum laude with a B.A. degree from New York University College of Arts and Sciences in 1975. He earned a Ph.D. from The Rockefeller University in 1981 in cellular immunology, working in Zanvil A. Cohn’s laboratory with Ralph M. Steinman on groundbreaking studies of mouse dendritic cells.

As a Ph.D. student, Nussenzweig was the first to show that dendritic cells present foreign antigens to initiate T cell immunity. He also produced the first dendritic cell-specific monoclonal antibody and cloned the first dendritic cell receptor.

Nussenzweig received an M.D. from New York University School of Medicine in 1982 and completed his internship and residency in internal medicine, and a clinical fellowship in infectious diseases at Massachusetts General Hospital in 1985. From 1986 to 1989, he was a postdoctoral fellow in genetics in the Harvard Medical School laboratory of Philip Leder. Nussenzweig returned to The Rockefeller University as an assistant professor in 1990 and he became an associate professor in 1994, and a professor and senior physician in 1996. In 2013, he was named the first Zanvil A. Cohn and Ralph M. Steinman Professor.

== Summary of research achievements ==
Nussenzweig studies molecular aspects of the immune system’s adaptive and innate responses, using a combination of biochemistry, molecular biology, and genetics. Work on adaptive immunity focuses on B lymphocytes and antibodies to HIV-1, while work on innate immunity focuses on dendritic cells. The laboratory has isolated and cloned human antibodies to HIV-1 and explored their roles in prevention and therapy. In clinical trials, a broadly neutralizing antibody isolated from an HIV-infected patient was shown to be safe and effective and to interfere with chronic infection in a way that traditional antiretroviral therapy does not. His research has led to the development of innovative vaccines against infectious diseases and new treatments for autoimmunity.

== Awards and honors ==
- American Association of Immunologists Meritorious Career Award, 2004
- American Academy of Arts and Sciences, 2007
- Lee C. Howley Sr. Prize for Arthritis Research, 2008
- National Academy of Medicine, 2009
- National Academy of Sciences, 2011
- Brazilian Academy of Sciences, 2011
- Nobel Prize Lecture on behalf of Ralph Steinman, 2011
- Brazil Diaspora Prize, 2015
- Spanish Royal Academy, 2016
- Rabbi Shai Shacknai Memorial Prize in Immunology and Cancer Research, 2016
- Robert Koch Award, 2016
- AAI-BioLegend Herzenberg Award, 2017
- Sanofi-Institut Pasteur Award, 2017
