= Jens Juul Holst =

Danish physician and physiologist (born 1945)

- Born: 31 August 1945 (age 81); Copenhagen, Denmark
- Education: University of Copenhagen
- Scientific career
- Fields: Incretins; Diabetes; Exenatide; Gut hormones; Glucagon-like peptides
- Workplaces: University of Copenhagen

Jens Juul Holst (born 31 August 1945) is a Danish physician and physiologist. He is known for discovering and describing the hormone glucagon-like peptide-1 (GLP-1), a hormone in the gut that plays an important role in the onset and development of Type 2 diabetes. In collaboration with researcher and author Arne Astrup, he discovered that GLP-1 acts as a satiety hormone in humans.

In 2020, he was awarded the Warren Alpert Foundation Prize along Daniel J. Drucker and Joel F. Habener. In 2021, he was awarded the Canada Gairdner International Award along Daniel J. Drucker, Joel F. Habener, and Mary-Claire King. He was also awarded the Banting Medal by the American Diabetes Association (ADA). In 2024, he was awarded the Princess of Asturias Awards for Technical and Scientific Research along Daniel J. Drucker, Jeffrey M. Friedman, Joel F. Habener, and Svetlana Mojsov.

In 2024, he received the Tang Prize in the category of "Biopharmaceutical Science", and the BBVA Foundation Frontiers of Knowledge Award in the category "Biology and Biomedicine". In 2025, he received the Breakthrough Prize in Life Sciences alongside Daniel Drucker, Joel Habener, Svetlana Mojsov, and Lotte Bjerre Knudsen).
