= AMPK =

AMPK may refer to:

- AMP-activated protein kinase, an enzyme
- (acetyl-CoA carboxylase) kinase, an enzyme
