= Daniel J. Drucker =

Canadian endocrinologist (born 1956)

Daniel Drucker FRS, FRCPC, OC
- Born: Daniel Joshua Drucker; 23 June 1956 (age 70); Montreal, Quebec, Canada
- Education: University of Toronto (MD)
- Known for: Discovery of biological actions of GLP-1
- Awards: Breakthrough Prize (2025); BBVA Foundation Frontiers of Knowledge Award (2025); Time100 Most Influential People (2024); Time100 Health (2024); Princess of Asturias Awards (2024); Wolf Prize in Medicine (2023); VinFuture Prize (2023); Canadian Medical Hall of Fame (2022); Canada Gairdner International Award (2021); Warren Alpert Foundation Prize (2020)
- Scientific career
- Fields: Incretins; Diabetes; Exenatide; Gut hormones; Glucagon-like peptides
- Workplaces: University of Toronto Faculty of Medicine; Massachusetts General Hospital
- Website: glucagon.com; discover.research.utoronto.ca/4090-daniel-drucker; lunenfeld.ca/researchers/drucker

Daniel Joshua Drucker (born 23 June 1956) is a Canadian endocrinologist renowned for his breakthrough discoveries of the biological actions of glucagon-like peptides GLP-1 and GLP-2, including GLP-1's key role in stimulating glucose-dependent insulin secretion, reducing food intake, protecting the heart, and reducing systemic inflammation. His scientific research has been a driving force in GLP-1's journey from a newly discovered peptide sequence to the mechanism behind globally used and life-changing therapeutics for type 2 diabetes and obesity. It has also driven transformative new therapeutics for intestinal failure and other metabolic disorders. A Fellow of the Royal Society, and laureate of the 2023 Wolf Prize in Medicine, he is a University Professor of Medicine at the University of Toronto and Senior Investigator at the Lunenfeld-Tanenbaum Research Institute, Sinai Health, Toronto.

== Early life and education ==
Drucker was born and grew up in Montreal, went to high school in Ottawa, and then enrolled at the University of Ottawa, studying science. In 1976, he moved to Toronto, where he studied medicine at the University of Toronto, graduating in 1980. He completed his internship at Johns Hopkins Hospital (1980–81) and completed his internal medicine and endocrinology residencies at the University of Toronto (1981–84).

== Career and research ==
In 1984, Drucker began his research career at Massachusetts General Hospital and Harvard Medical School, studying molecular endocrinology in the lab of Professor Joel Habener with the support from a Medical Research Council of Canada Centennial Fellowship. Drucker’s independent discoveries in Boston included the demonstration that proglucagon could be cleaved into multiple glucagon-like peptides, including several distinct isoforms of GLP-1. He then discovered that the truncated form of GLP-1(7-37) directly stimulated cyclic AMP formation, insulin secretion, and insulin gene expression; notably, it did so only when glucose levels were elevated.

=== Further discoveries of the therapeutic potential of GLP-1 at University of Toronto ===
In 1987 Drucker returned to Toronto, taking on the position of Assistant Professor of Medicine at the University of Toronto and continuing his research on the glucagon-like peptides while also working as a physician. In 1996, Drucker was one of several investigators who demonstrated that GLP-1 reduced food intake in preclinical studies. Notably, the experiments in the Drucker lab demonstrated that this action of GLP-1 in the brain required the functional canonical GLP-1 receptor. Drucker, together with colleagues at Tufts Universities, filed multiple patents describing the utility of targeting the DPP-4 enzyme, and published studies demonstrating that genetic or chemical inactivation of DPP-4 prevented degradation of GLP-1 and GIP, supporting the development of DPP-4 inhibitors for the treatment of type 2 diabetes. In all, Drucker's discovery science has led to 33 issued US patents supporting translational drug development efforts in the field of peptide based therapeutics. Collectively, the body of work from multiple investigators and companies led to the development of two leading classes of diabetes medications: GLP-1 receptor agonists and DPP4 inhibitors.

=== Discovery of GLP-2 actions leading to Short Bowel Syndrome treatments ===
In 1996, Drucker also discovered the first biological actions for GLP-2, demonstrating that it augmented crypt cell proliferation and expansion of the mucosal epithelium in the small bowel of mice and rats. He subsequently identified and characterized a DPP-4-resistant molecule, teduglutide, that was ultimately developed and approved for the treatment of short bowel syndrome in adults and children, a disorder in which fluids are poorly absorbed after resection of the small intestine.

=== Research supporting the development, safety and benefits of GLP-1 therapeutics ===
Drucker joined the Samuel Lunenfeld Research Institute at Mount Sinai Hospital in Toronto in 2006. In 2008 he led studies aimed at the development and testing of the first long-acting, once-weekly version of the diabetes medication exenatide. He later studied the long-term effects of related weight-loss medicines on bowel health. Drucker has also led the identification of the cardioprotective mechanisms of GLP-1 action. Notably, in 2009 he demonstrated in mice that these effects were not dependent on glucose lowering or weight loss – findings confirmed over a decade later in cardiovascular outcome trials. His discoveries predicted the safety of GLP-1 receptor agonists for their expanding applications to treat obesity and other chronic conditions. Most recently, Drucker has identified multiple mechanisms linking GLP-1 to the reduction of inflammation^{.}

Drucker holds the Banting and Best Diabetes Centre-Novo Nordisk Chair in Incretin Biology. His many national and international recognitions include the 2023 Wolf Prize in Medicine, awarded for "pioneering work in elucidating the mechanisms and therapeutic potential of enteroendocrine hormones," as well as the Warren Alpert Foundation Prize and the Canada Gairdner International Award, among numerous others. Drucker was elected a Royal Society Fellow in 2015, a National Academy of Sciences International Member in 2021and a National Academy of Medicine International Member in 2023. In 2024, he was named among Time magazine's 100 most influential people.

== Awards and honours ==
- 2007 Donald F. Steiner Award for Outstanding Diabetes Research, University of Chicago
- 2008 Prix Galien Canada for Outstanding Pharmaceutical Research
- 2009 Clinical Investigator Award, Endocrine Society
- 2012 Claude Bernard Prize, European Association for the Study of Diabetes
- 2012 Fellow of the Royal Society of Canada
- 2013 Oon International Award for Preventative Medicine, University of Cambridge
- 2014 Banting Medal for Scientific Achievement, American Diabetes Association
- 2014 Manpei Suzuki Foundation International Prize for Diabetes, Japan
- 2015 Fellow of the Royal Society
- 2015 Officer of the Order of Canada
- 2017 Rolf Luft Award in Endocrinology and Diabetes Research, Karolinska Institute
- 2017 Harrington Prize for Innovation in Medicine, American Society for Clinical Investigation and the Harrington Institute (co-recipient with Joel Habener and Jens Juul Holst)
- 2019 Harold Hamm International Prize for Biomedical Research in Diabetes
- 2019 Novo Nordisk Foundation and European Association for the Study of Diabetes Prize for Excellence in Diabetes Research (watch the mini documentary about Drucker produced by the Novo Nordisk Foundation for the occasion)
- 2019 Lifetime Achievement Award, Helmholtz Diabetes Centre, Germany
- 2020 John Baxter Award for Entrepreneurship, Endocrine Society
- 2020 Transatlantic Medal, Society for Endocrinology
- 2020 Warren Alpert Foundation Prize for Biomedical Research (co-recipient with Joel Habener and Jens Juul Holst)
- 2021 International Member, National Academy of Sciences
- 2021 Canada Gairdner International Award (co-recipient with Joel Habener and Jens Juul Holst)
- 2022 Inductee of the Canadian Medical Hall of Fame
- 2023 Wolf Prize in Medicine
- 2023 International Member of the National Academy of Medicine
- 2023 VinFuture Prize for Innovators with Outstanding Achievements in Emerging Fields (co-recipient with Joel Habener, Jens Juul Holst and Svetlana Mojsov)
- 2024 Princess of Asturias Award for Technical and Scientific Research (co-recipient with Jeffrey M. Friedman, Joel Habener, Jens Juul Holst and Svetlana Mojsov)
- 2024 Time100 Most Influential People and Time100 Health
- 2024 Golden Plate Award, American Academy of Achievement
- 2024 Fred Conrad Koch Lifetime Achievement Award, Endocrine Society
- 2024 TOPS Research Achievement Award, The Obesity Society
- 2025 Warren Triennial Prize, Massachusetts General Hospital (co-recipient with Joel Habener and Svetlana Mojsov)
- 2025 BBVA Foundation Frontiers of Knowledge Award in Biology and Biomedicine (co-recipient with Joel Habener, Jens Juul Holst and Svetlana Mojsov)
- 2025 Solomon A. Berson Award, American Physiology Society
- 2025 Breakthrough Prize in Life Sciences (co-recipient with Joel Habener, Jens Juul Holst, Svetlana Mojsov and Lotte Bjerre Knudsen)
- 2026 Governor General's Innovation Award

== Selected publications ==
- Drucker, D. J.; Philippe, J; Mojsov, S; Chick, W. L.; Habener, J. F. (1987). "Glucagon-like peptide I stimulates insulin gene expression and increases cyclic AMP levels in a rat islet cell line". Proceedings of the National Academy of Sciences of the United States of America. 84 (10): 3434–8. Bibcode:1987PNAS...84.3434D. doi:10.1073/pnas.84.10.3434. PMC 304885. PMID 3033647.
- Scrocchi, L.S.; Brown, T.J.; Maclusky, N.; Brubaker, P.L.; Auerbach, A.B.; Joyner, A.L.; Drucker, D.J. (1996). "Glucose intolerance but normal satiety in mice with a null mutation in the glucagon-like peptide 1 receptor gene". Nature Medicine. 2 (11): 1254–1258. doi:10.1038/nm1196-1254. PMID 8898756.
- Drucker, D.J.; Ehrlich, P.; Asa, S. L.; Brubaker, P.L. (1996). "Induction of intestinal epithelial proliferation by glucagon-like peptide 2". Proc Natl Acad Sci U S A. 93 (15): 7911–7916. Bibcode:1996PNAS...93.7911D. doi:10.1073/pnas.93.15.7911. PMC 38848. PMID 38848.
- Chen, E.; Drucker, D.J. (1997). "Tissue-specific expression of unique mRNAs that encode proglucagon-derived peptides or exendin 4 in the lizard". Journal of Biological Chemistry. 272 (7): 4108–15. doi:10.1074/jbc.272.7.4108. PMID 9020121.
- Drucker, D.J.; Shi, Q.; Crivici, A.; Sumner-Smith, M.; Tavares, W.; Hill, M.; DeForest, L.; Cooper, S.; Brubaker, P.L. (1997). "Regulation of the biological activity of glucagon-like peptide 2 in vivo by dipeptidyl peptidase IV". Nature Biotechnology. 93 (15): 7911–6. doi:10.1038/nbt0797-673. PMID 9219272.
- Yusta, B; Baggio, L.L.; Estall, J.L.; Koehler, J.A.; Holland, D.P.; Li, H; Pipeleers, D; Ling, Z; Drucker, D.J. (2006). "GLP-1 receptor activation improves beta cell function and survival following induction of endoplasmic reticulum stress". Cell Metabolism. 4 (5): 391–406. doi:10.1016/j.cmet.2006.10.001. PMID 17084712.
- Drucker, D. J.; Buse, J. B.; Taylor, K.; Kendall, D. M.; Trautmann, M.; Zhuang, D.; Porter, L. (2008). "Exenatide once weekly versus twice daily for the treatment of type 2 diabetes: A randomised, open-label, non-inferiority study". The Lancet. 372 (9645): 1240–1250. doi:10.1016/S0140-6736(08)61206-4. PMID 18782641. S2CID 12667840.
- Kim, M.; Platt, M.; Shibasaki, T.; Quaggin, S.; Backx, P.H.; Seino, S.; Simpson, J.; Drucker, D.J. (2013). "GLP-1 receptor activation and Epac2 link atrial natriuretic peptide secretion to control of blood pressure". Nature Medicine. 19 (5): 567–575. doi:10.1038/nm.3128. PMID 23542788.
- Wong, C.K.; Yusta, B.; Koehler, J.A.; Baggio, L.L.; McLean, B.A.; Matthews, D.; Seeley, R.J.; Drucker, D.J. (2022). "Divergent roles for the gut intraepithelial lymphocyte GLP-1R in control of metabolism, microbiota, and T cell-induced inflammation". Cell Metabolism. 34 (10): 1514–1531. doi:10.1016/j.cmet.2022.08.003. PMID 36027914.
- Wong, C.K.; MacLean, B.A.; Baggio, L.L.; Koehler, J.A.; Hammoud, R.; Rittig, N.; Yabut, J.M.; Seeley, R.J.; Brown, T.K.; Drucker, D.J. (2024). "Central glucagon-like peptide 1 receptor activation inhibits Toll-like receptor agonist-induced inflammation". Cell Metabolism. 36 (1): 130–143. doi:10.1016/j.cmet.2023.11.009. PMID 38113888.
