= Off the Scales =

2025 book

Off the Scales: The Inside Story of Ozempic and the Race to Cure Obesity
- Author: Aimee Donnellan
- Language: English
- Publisher: St. Martin's Press
- Publication date: November 18, 2025
- Publication place: United States
- Pages: 320
- ISBN: 978-1250389060

Off the Scales: The Inside Story of Ozempic and the Race to Cure Obesity is a 2025 book by journalist Aimee Donnellan.

== Critical reception ==
Kirkus Reviews gave the book a positive review, saying that it was a "rich, even action-packed narrative of medical discovery... capably told and without an ounce of flab." Publishers Weekly described the book as "enlightening... an astute, fair-minded primer on the drug."

Writing in The Guardian, British palliative physician Rachel Clarke gave the book a positive review, noting that "one of the great strengths of Reuters journalist Aimee Donnellan’s first book is its insistence on framing the discovery of the new weight-loss drugs within the fraught social and cultural context of beauty norms, body image and health." Writing in The Wall Street Journal, David A. Shaywitz of the Harvard Medical School praised the book for delivering "a nuanced view of the transformational promise — for better and worse — of these unsettling medical marvels."

Alexandra Thompson of The New Scientist gave the book a mildly positive review, applauding Donnellan for her portrayal of obesity as a medical condition and for "driving home the message that drug development is rarely done for philanthropic reasons," but criticising the book for having "some fairly slow sections" and for not touching on the limitations of GLP-1 drugs.
