= Liraglutide =

Anti-diabetic medication

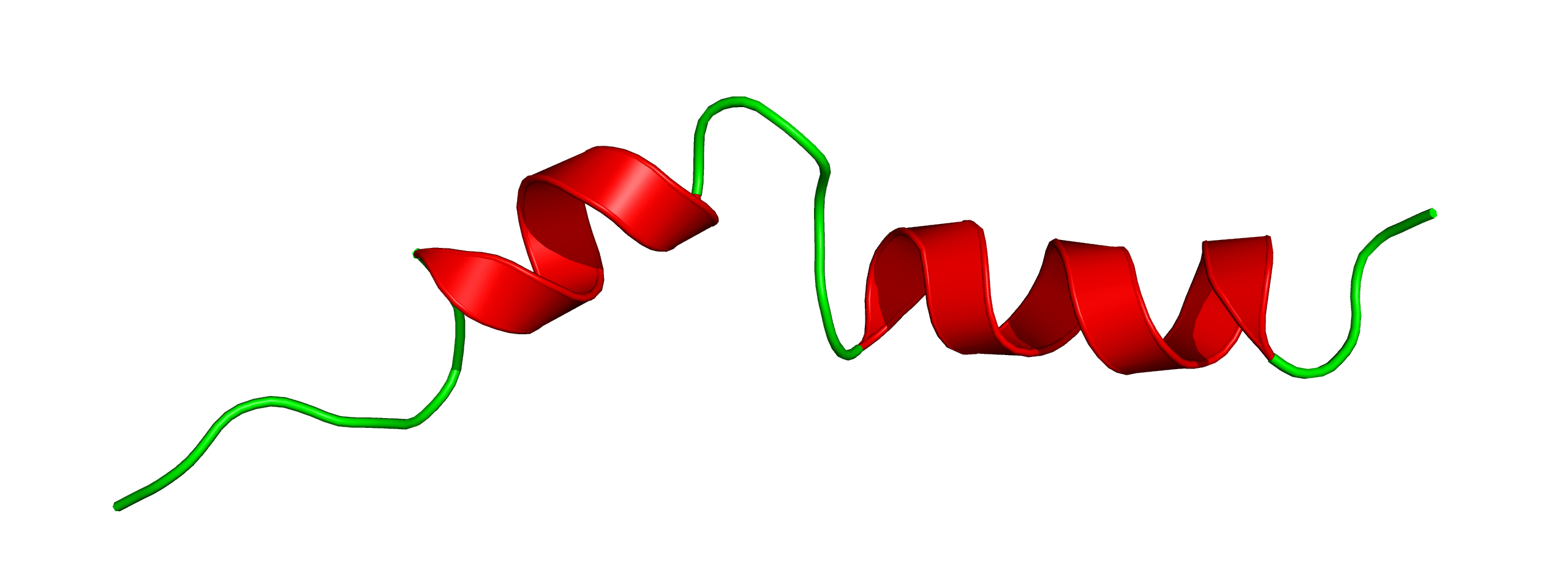

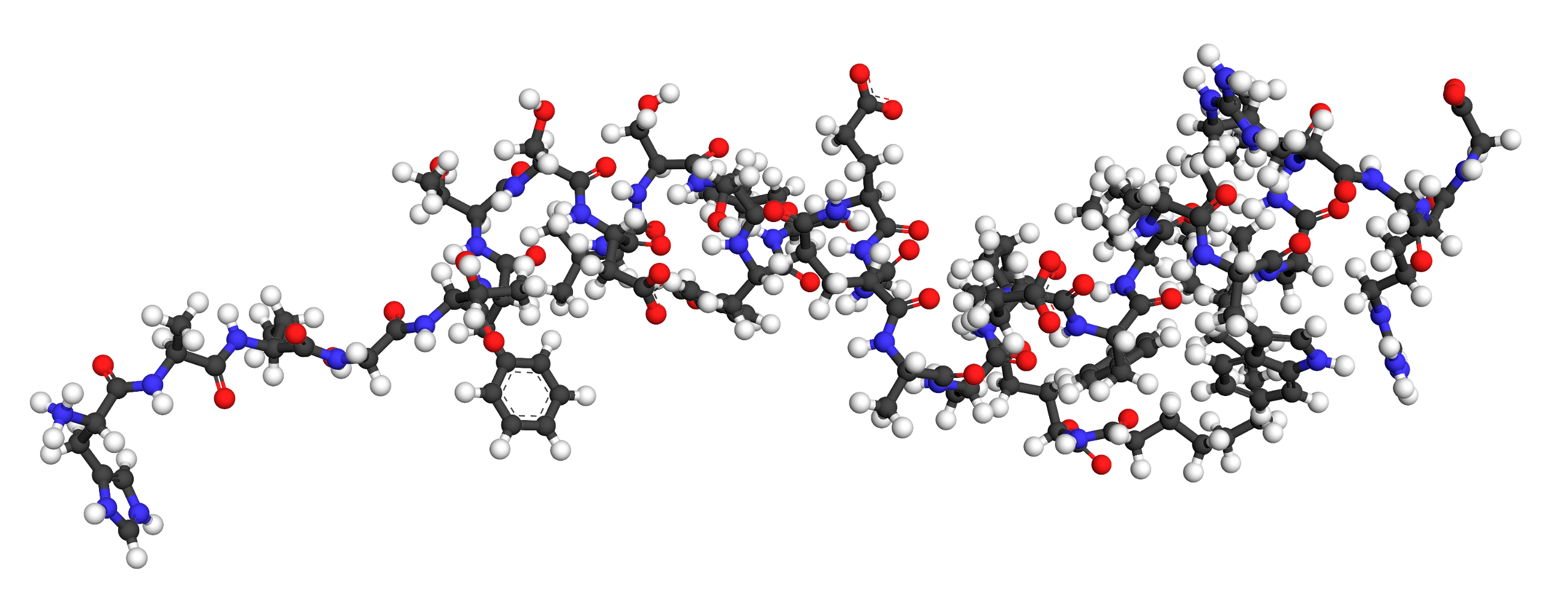
- NMR structure of liraglutide. PDB entry 4apd

Clinical data
- Trade names: Victoza, others
- AHFS/Drugs.com: Monograph
- MedlinePlus: a611003
- License data: US DailyMed: Liraglutide
- Pregnancy category: AU: B3
- Routes of administration: Subcutaneous
- ATC code: A10BJ02 (WHO)

Legal status
- Legal status: AU: S4 (Prescription only); CA: ℞-only; UK: POM (Prescription only); US: ℞-only; EU: Rx-only

Identifiers
- CAS Number: 204656-20-2
- PubChem CID: 16134956
- IUPHAR/BPS: 1133
- DrugBank: DB06655
- ChemSpider: 24571200
- UNII: 839I73S42A
- KEGG: D06404
- ChEBI: CHEBI:71193
- CompTox Dashboard (EPA): DTXSID60174433
- ECHA InfoCard: 100.241.015

Chemical and physical data
- Formula: C_{172}H_{265}N_{43}O_{51}
- Molar mass: 3751.262 g·mol^{−1}
- 3D model (JSmol): Interactive image
- SMILES: CCCCCCCCCCCCCCCC(=O)N[C@@H](CCC(=O)NCCCC[C@H](NC(=O)[C@H](C)NC(=O)[C@H](C)NC(=O)[C@H](CCC(N)=O)NC(=O)CNC(=O)[C@H](CCC(O)=O)NC(=O)[C@H](CC(C)C)NC(=O)[C@H](CC1=CC=C(O)C=C1)NC(=O)[C@H](CO)NC(=O)[C@H](CO)NC(=O)[C@@H](NC(=O)[C@H](CC(O)=O)NC(=O)[C@H](CO)NC(=O)[C@@H](NC(=O)[C@H](CC1=CC=CC=C1)NC(=O)[C@@H](NC(=O)CNC(=O)[C@H](CCC(O)=O)NC(=O)[C@H](C)NC(=O)[C@@H](N)CC1=CN=CN1)[C@@H](C)O)[C@@H](C)O)C(C)C)C(=O)N[C@@H](CCC(O)=O)C(=O)N[C@@H](CC1=CC=CC=C1)C(=O)N[C@@H]([C@@H](C)CC)C(=O)N[C@@H](C)C(=O)N[C@@H](CC1=CNC2=CC=CC=C12)C(=O)N[C@@H](CC(C)C)C(=O)N[C@@H](C(C)C)C(=O)N[C@@H](CCCNC(N)=N)C(=O)NCC(=O)N[C@@H](CCCNC(N)=N)C(=O)NCC(O)=O)C(O)=O
- InChI: InChI=1S/C172H265N43O51/c1-18-20-21-22-23-24-25-26-27-28-29-30-37-53-128(223)193-112(59-64-132(227)228)148(244)180-68-41-40-50-111(154(250)199-116(62-67-135(233)234)155(251)204-120(73-100-44-33-31-34-45-100)160(256)214-140(93(11)19-2)168(264)192-97(15)146(242)201-122(76-103-79-183-108-49-39-38-48-106(103)108)158(254)203-118(72-90(5)6)159(255)212-138(91(7)8)166(262)200-110(52-43-70-182-172(177)178)150(246)184-81-129(224)194-109(51-42-69-181-171(175)176)149(245)187-84-137(237)238)196-144(240)95(13)189-143(239)94(12)191-153(249)115(58-63-127(174)222)195-130(225)82-185-152(248)114(61-66-134(231)232)198-156(252)117(71-89(3)4)202-157(253)119(75-102-54-56-105(221)57-55-102)205-163(259)124(85-216)208-165(261)126(87-218)209-167(263)139(92(9)10)213-162(258)123(78-136(235)236)206-164(260)125(86-217)210-170(266)142(99(17)220)215-161(257)121(74-101-46-35-32-36-47-101)207-169(265)141(98(16)219)211-131(226)83-186-151(247)113(60-65-133(229)230)197-145(241)96(14)190-147(243)107(173)77-104-80-179-88-188-104/h31-36,38-39,44-49,54-57,79-80,88-99,107,109-126,138-142,183,216-221H,18-30,37,40-43,50-53,58-78,81-87,173H2,1-17H3,(H2,174,222)(H,179,188)(H,180,244)(H,184,246)(H,185,248)(H,186,247)(H,187,245)(H,189,239)(H,190,243)(H,191,249)(H,192,264)(H,193,223)(H,194,224)(H,195,225)(H,196,240)(H,197,241)(H,198,252)(H,199,250)(H,200,262)(H,201,242)(H,202,253)(H,203,254)(H,204,251)(H,205,259)(H,206,260)(H,207,265)(H,208,261)(H,209,263)(H,210,266)(H,211,226)(H,212,255)(H,213,258)(H,214,256)(H,215,257)(H,227,228)(H,229,230)(H,231,232)(H,233,234)(H,235,236)(H,237,238)(H4,175,176,181)(H4,177,178,182)/t93-,94-,95-,96-,97-,98+,99+,107-,109-,110-,111-,112-,113-,114-,115-,116-,117-,118-,119-,120-,121-,122-,123-,124-,125-,126-,138-,139-,140-,141-,142-/m0/s1; Key:KAIWQAZASNVPLR-QCIJIYAXSA-N

Liraglutide, sold under the brand names Victoza and Saxenda among others, is an anti-diabetic medication used to treat type 2 diabetes, and chronic obesity. It is a second-line therapy for diabetes following first-line therapy with metformin. Its effects on long-term health outcomes like heart disease and life expectancy are unclear. It is given by injection under the skin.

Liraglutide is a glucagon-like peptide-1 receptor agonist (GLP-1 receptor agonist) also known as incretin mimetics. It works by increasing insulin release from the pancreas and decreases excessive glucagon release.

Common side effects include low blood sugar, nausea, dizziness, abdominal pain, and pain at the site of injection. Gastrointestinal side-effects tend to be strongest at the beginning of treatment period and subside over time. Other serious side effects may include angioedema, pancreatitis, gallbladder disease, and kidney problems. Use in pregnancy and breastfeeding is of unclear safety.

Liraglutide was approved for medical use in the European Union in 2009, and in the United States in 2010. It is available as a generic medication. In 2023, it was the 209th most commonly prescribed medication in the United States, with more than 2 million prescriptions.

== Medical uses ==
Liraglutide is an anti-diabetic medication used for the treatment of type 2 diabetes or obesity. Liraglutide (Victoza) is indicated as an adjunct to diet and exercise to improve glycemic control in people aged ten years of age and older with type 2 diabetes; and to reduce the risk of major adverse cardiovascular events in adults with type 2 diabetes and established cardiovascular disease. Liraglutide (Saxenda) is indicated in combination with a reduced calorie diet and increased physical activity to reduce excess body weight and maintain weight reduction long term in people aged twelve years of age and older with body weight greater than 60 kilograms (130 lb) and obesity; and in adults with overweight in the presence of at least one weight-related comorbid condition.

=== Type 2 diabetes ===
Liraglutide improves control of blood glucose. In people with high cardiovascular risk, liraglutide has been shown to reduce the risk for first occurrence of death from cardiovascular causes, nonfatal myocardial infarction, or nonfatal stroke. American Diabetes Association (ADA) guidelines consider liraglutide a first line pharmacologic therapy for type 2 diabetes (usually together with metformin), specifically for people with atherosclerotic cardiovascular disease or obesity. A 2011 Cochrane review showed a HbA1c reduction of 0.24% more with liraglutide 1.8 mg compared to insulin glargine, 0.33% more than exenatide 10 μg twice daily, sitagliptin and rosiglitazone. In a randomized controlled trial (RCT) comparing liraglutide, glargine, glimepiride, and sitagliptin (all added to metformin) with a follow-up of five years, glargine and liraglutide were modestly more effective in achieving and maintaining target HbA1c, with no difference in outcomes of microvascular and cardiovascular disease.

=== Obesity ===
Liraglutide may also be used together with diet and exercise for chronic weight management in adults. Liraglutide led to greater weight loss than some previous glucagon-like peptide analogues, but is less effective than the standard weight loss dose of semaglutide.

== Adverse effects ==
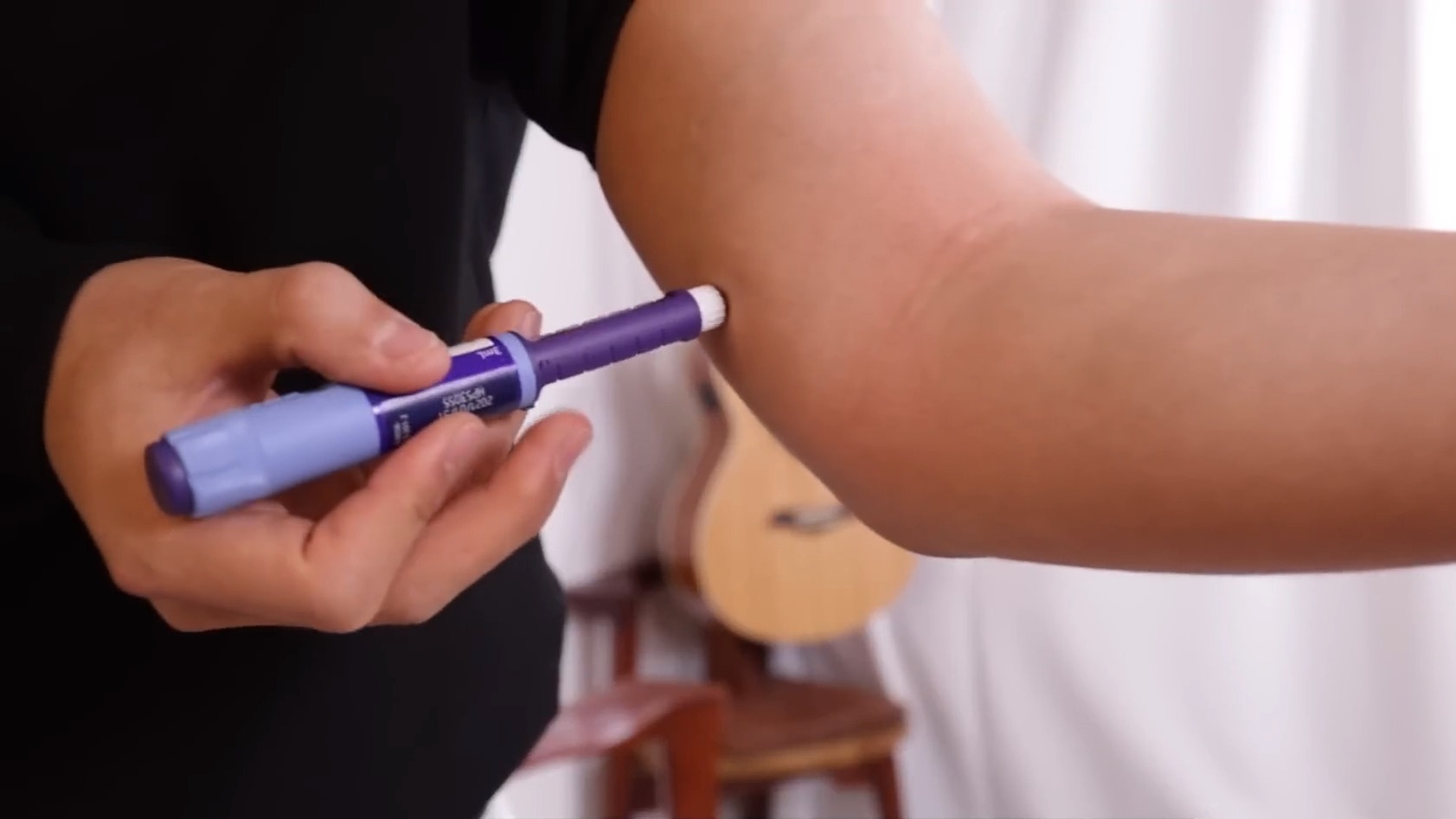
Liraglutide is being injected into the arm by the patient.

Common side effects include low blood sugar, nausea, dizziness, abdominal pain, and pain at the site of injection. Gastrointestinal side-effects tend to be strongest at the beginning of treatment period and subside over time. Other serious side effects may include angioedema, pancreatitis, gallbladder disease, and kidney problems. Use in pregnancy and breastfeeding is of unclear safety.

A boxed warning in the US prescribing information cautions that medullary thyroid cancers have been observed in rats treated with liraglutide, but it is "unknown whether liraglutide causes thyroid C-cell tumors, including medullary thyroid carcinoma, in humans, as relevance to humans of such tumors in rodents has not been determined."

=== Thyroid cancer ===
At exposures eight times greater than those used in humans, liraglutide caused a statistically significant increase in thyroid tumors in rats. The clinical relevance of these findings is unknown. In clinical trials, the rate of thyroid tumors in participants treated with liraglutide was 1.3 per 1000 participant years (4 people) compared to 1.0 per 1000 participants (1 person) in comparison groups. The sole participant in the comparator group and four of the five participants in the liraglutide group had serum markers (elevated calcitonin) suggestive of pre-existing disease at baseline.

The US Food and Drug Administration (FDA) said serum calcitonin, a biomarker of medullary thyroid cancer, was slightly increased in liraglutide patients, but still within normal ranges, and it required ongoing monitoring for 15 years in a cancer registry.

=== Pancreatitis ===
In 2013, an apparently statistically significant association between hospitalization for acute pancreatitis and prior treatment with GLP-1 derivatives (such as exenatide) and DPP-4 inhibitors (such as sitagliptin) was reported. In response, the US Food and Drug Administration and the European Medicines Agency conducted a review of all available data regarding the possible connection between incretin mimetics and pancreatitis or pancreatic cancer. In a joint 2014 letter, the agencies concluded that "A pooled analysis of data from 14,611 patients with type 2 diabetes from 25 clinical trials in the sitagliptin database provided no compelling evidence of an increased risk of pancreatitis or pancreatic cancer" and "Both agencies agree that assertions concerning a causal association between incretin-based drugs and pancreatitis or pancreatic cancer, as expressed recently in the scientific literature and in the media, are inconsistent with the current data. The FDA and the EMA have not reached a final conclusion regarding such a causal relationship. Although the totality of the data that have been reviewed provides reassurance, pancreatitis will continue to be considered a risk associated with these drugs until more data are available; both agencies continue to investigate this safety signal."

=== Suicidal behavior and ideation ===
In January 2026, the US Food and Drug Administration requested removal of suicidal behavior and ideation warning from glucagon-like peptide-1 receptor agonist (GLP-1 RA) medications.

== Pharmacodynamics ==
Liraglutide is an acylated glucagon-like peptide-1 (GLP-1) receptor agonist, derived from human GLP-1-(7-37), a less common form of endogenous GLP-1.

It reduces meal-related hyperglycemia (for 24 hours after administration) by increasing insulin secretion (only) when required by increasing glucose levels, delaying gastric emptying, and suppressing prandial glucagon secretion.

Liraglutide leads to insulin release in pancreatic beta cells in the presence of elevated blood glucose. This insulin secretion subsides as glucose concentrations decrease and approach euglycemia (normal blood glucose level). It also decreases glucagon secretion in a glucose-dependent manner and delays gastric emptying. Unlike endogenous GLP-1, liraglutide is stable against metabolic degradation by peptidases, with a plasma half-life of 13 hours.

== Pharmacokinetics ==
Endogenous GLP-1 has a plasma half-life of 1.5–2 minutes due to degradation by the ubiquitous enzymes, dipeptidyl peptidase-4 (DPP4) and neutral endopeptidases (NEP). The half-life after intramuscular injection is approximately half an hour, so even administered this way, it has limited use as a therapeutic agent. The metabolically active forms of GLP-1 are the endogenous GLP-1-(7-36)NH_{2} and the more rare GLP-1-(7-37). The prolonged action of liraglutide is achieved by attaching a fatty acid molecule at one position of the GLP-1-(7-37) molecule, enabling it to both self-associate and bind to albumin within the subcutaneous tissue and bloodstream. The active GLP-1 is then released from albumin at a slow, consistent rate. Albumin binding also results in slower degradation and reduced renal elimination compared to that of GLP-1-(7-37).

== History ==
Scientists at the Novo laboratories initially called liraglutide NN2211 in early studies from 2001 to 2004.

== Society and culture ==
=== Legal status ===
In May 2026, the Committee for Medicinal Products for Human Use of the European Medicines Agency adopted a positive opinion, recommending the granting of a marketing authorization for the medicinal product Ablymico, indicated for weight management as an adjunct to a reduced-calorie diet and increased physical activity. The applicant for this medicinal product is STADA Arzneimittel AG. Ablymico is a hybrid medicine of liraglutide (Saxenda), which has been authorized in the European Union since March 2015. Ablymico contains the same active substance as Saxenda, but it is chemically synthesized, whereas the active substance in the reference products is of biological origin. Ablymico was authorized for medical use in the European Union in July 2026.

In May 2026, the CHMP adopted a positive opinion, recommending the granting of a marketing authorization for the medicinal product Liraglutide Stada, intended for the treatment of insufficiently controlled type 2 diabetes. The applicant for this medicinal product is STADA Arzneimittel AG. Liraglutide Stada is a hybrid medicine of liraglutide (Victoza), which has been authorized in the European Union since June 2009. Liraglutide Stada contains the same active substance as Victoza, but it is chemically synthesized, whereas the active substance in the reference products is of biological origin.

=== Brand names ===
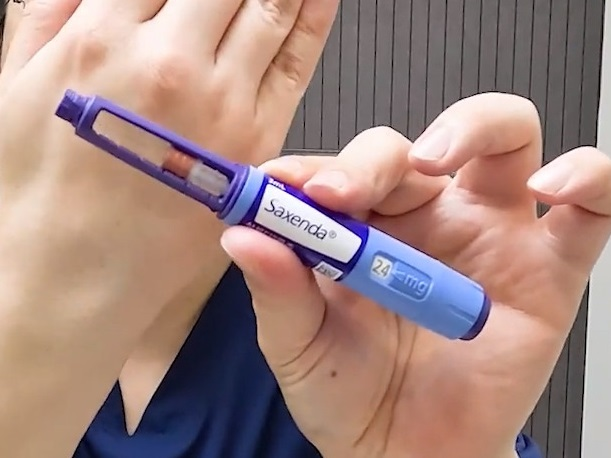
Liraglutide injection pen sold under the brand name Saxenda.

Liraglutide is sold under the brand name Victoza in the US, UK, UAE, Kuwait, India, Iran, Canada, Europe, Japan and the Philippines. It has been launched in Germany, Italy, Denmark, the Netherlands, Sweden, Japan, Canada, the United States, France, Indonesia, Malaysia and Singapore. Liraglutide is also known to be sold as Saxenda in Australia, Brazil, Canada, Germany, Indonesia, Iran, Ireland, Israel, Norway, Czech Republic, Poland, Portugal, South Korea, Switzerland, The United Kingdom and the US, and also as Enligria and Quinliro in Russia.

=== Marketing ===
Liraglutide was approved by the US Food and Drug Administration (FDA) in 2014, and by the European Medicines Agency (EMA) in 2015, for adults with a body mass index (BMI) of 30 or greater (obesity) or a BMI of 27 or greater (overweight) who have at least one weight-related condition. Liraglutide was approved by the FDA in 2019, for treatment of children aged ten years of age or older with type 2 diabetes, making it the first non-insulin drug approved to treat type 2 diabetes in children since metformin was approved in 2000.

Novo made deals with generic manufacturers to enter the United States market in 2024. The FDA approved the first generic liraglutide in December 2024, and granted the approval to Hikma Pharmaceuticals USA

=== Controversy ===
In 2010, Novo breached the Association of the British Pharmaceutical Industry's code of conduct by failing to provide information about side effects, and by promoting it prior to being granted market authorization.

In 2012, the non-profit consumer advocacy group Public Citizen petitioned the US Food and Drug Administration (FDA) to immediately remove liraglutide from the market because they concluded that risks of thyroid cancer and pancreatitis outweigh any documented benefits.

In 2017, Novo agreed to pay $58.65 million to settle multiple whistleblower lawsuits alleging that the company had illegally marketed, promoted, and sold Victoza for off-label uses (such as for type 1 diabetes) in violation of the Federal Food, Drug, and Cosmetic Act and the False Claims Act. Novo paid an additional $1.45 million to the states of California and Illinois to settle whistleblower cases alleging fraud against private commercial health insurers.

== Research ==
In September 2024, it was reported that a study found that liraglutide helped children aged 6 to 12 years of age reduce their body mass index by 7.4% in a 56-week trial.
