= Svetlana Mojsov =

Macedonian American chemist

- Светлана Мојсов
- Born: 8 December 1947 (age 78); Skopje, SR Macedonia. SFR Yugoslavia
- Education: Rockefeller University
- Spouse: Michel C. Nussenzweig
- Father: Lazar Mojsov
- Awards: 2023 VinFuture 2023 Nature's 10; 2023 Time100 Health; 2024 Pearl Meister Greengard Prize; 2024 Time 100 Most Influential People; 2024 Princess of Asturias Awards; 2024 Tang Prize - Biopharmaceutical Science; 2024 Lasker Award; 2024 BBVA Foundation Frontiers of Knowledge Awards - Biology and Biomedicine; 2025 Breakthrough Prize in Life Sciences; 2025 Warren Triennial Prize; 2025 Distinguished Medical Science Award; 2025 Carothers Award from the American Chemical Society Delaware Section; 2025 Helen Dean King Award; 2025 Member of the National Academy of Sciences; 2025 Member of the Macedonian Academy of Sciences and Arts; 2026 Kimberly Prize in Biochemistry and Molecular Genetics; 2026 King Faisal Prize in Medicine; 2026 Boulder Peptide Foundation Meinehofer Award; 2026 Broermann Medical Innovation Award; 2026 Order 8-September awarded by President of North Macedonia; 2026 Professor Honoris Causa, Ss. Cyril and Methodius University in Skopje; 2026 Clarivate Citation Laureate in Physiology or Medicine 2027 Elaine Redding Brinster Prize in Science or Medicine
- Scientific career
- Fields: Biochemistry, Peptide synthesis
- Workplaces: Massachusetts General Hospital; Rockefeller University
- Thesis: Studies on solid-phase peptide synthesis: the synthesis of glucagon (1978)
- Doctoral advisor: Bruce Merrifield

Svetlana Mojsov (born December 8, 1947) is a Yugoslav-born, Macedonian American chemist whose study of glucagon-like peptide-1 (GLP-1) led to her uncovering its role in glucose metabolism and the secretion of insulin. Her research, which focuses on peptide synthesis, led to breakthroughs with GLP-1 and was the foundation used by Novo Nordisk to create therapeutic agents to combat diabetes and obesity. She is a Lulu Chow Wang and Robin Chemers Neustein Research Professor at Rockefeller University.

== Early life and education ==
Mojsov was born and raised in Skopje, SR Macedonia, which was then part of SFR Yugoslavia. She received her bachelor's degree in physical chemistry at the University of Belgrade in 1971. The following year she left Europe for the United States to join the graduate program at Rockefeller University. At Rockefeller she worked alongside Robert Bruce Merrifield (1984 Nobel Prize in Chemistry) studying the synthesis of peptides, the building blocks of proteins. Mojsov focused her research specifically on the synthesis of glucagon, a hormone which is released by the pancreas and is involved in regulating carbohydrate metabolism. She graduated from Rockefeller in 1978 with a Ph.D. in biochemistry. After graduation, Mojsov continued in Merrifield's lab as a research associate where she resumed exploring glucagon synthesis.

There was research dating back to the 1950s and 1960s around glucagon as involved in carbohydrate metabolism, but it was Mojsov's work in the 1980's that set the foundation for major advances in therapeutic implementation. These findings would later become the basis on which major drugs would be based.

== Research and career ==
In 1983 Mojsov was made the inaugural director of the Howard Hughes Medical Institute peptide research facility at Massachusetts General Hospital (MGH) in Boston, MA. She arrived at MGH shortly after Joel Habener had cloned proglucagon by studying anglerfish found in Boston Harbor and Graeme Bell published the sequence of the human proglucagon gene.

Mojsov played a pivotal role in establishing that human glucagon-like peptide-1 (GLP-1) is derived from the proglucagon precursor molecule as a 31-amino acid long peptide and is a gut hormone that will trigger glucose dependent insulin release.

Mojsov synthesized 31-amino acid long GLP-1 peptide using solid phase method, generated GLP-1 specific antibodies and developed analytical methods to detect in the intestine. Together with Gordon Weir at the Joslin Diabetes Center in Boston and Habener, Mojsov showed that small quantities of GLP-1 she synthesized could trigger glucose dependent release of insulin.

In the early 1990s the group at MGH used the GLP-1 Mojsov synthesized in human testing that established its therapeutic potential for treatment of diabetes. Without her knowledge, the GLP-1 derivatives Mojsov synthesized then were patented as peptides able to prompt the release of insulin. The patent listed Joel Habener as the sole-creator. Mojsov fought to have her name included in patents. MGH eventually agreed to amend four patents to include her name and she received one-third of drug royalties for one year. Drugs that emulate the action of GLP-1 have been developed into treatments for obesity and diabetes by Novo Nordisk and Eli Lilly.

In the 1990s, Mojsov returned to New York City and to Rockefeller University this time joining the laboratory of Ralph M. Steinman (2011 Nobel Prize in Physiology and Medicine). Mojsov continues to speak up to champion the importance of accurate attribution in scientific discovery as this occurs.

== Prizes and awards ==
  - 2023: VinFuture, Innovators with Outstanding Achievements in Emerging Fields – Jens Juul Holst, Joel Francis Habener, Daniel Joshua Drucker and Svetlana Mojsov
  - 2023: Nature 10 most influential people who shaped science
  - 2024: Pearl Meister Greengard Prize by the Rockefeller University
  - 2024: Time 100 Most Influential People, Pioneers section
  - 2024: Princess of Asturias Awards, Technical and Scientific Research – Daniel J. Drucker, Jeffrey M. Friedman, Joel F. Habener, Jens Juul Holst and Svetlana Mojsov
  - 2024: Tang Prize, Biopharmaceutical Science – Joel F. Habener, Svetlana Mojsov and Jens Juul Holst
  - 2024: Lasker-DeBakey Clinical Medical Research Award – Joel Habener, Svetlana Mojsov and Lotte Bjerre Knudsen
  - 2024: BBVA Foundation Frontiers of Knowledge Awards - Biology and Biomedicine - Daniel Joshua Drucker, Joel Habener, Jens Juul Holst and Svetlana Mojsov
  - 2025: Breakthrough Prize in Life Sciences - Daniel J. Drucker, Joel Habener, Jens Juul Holst, Lotte Bjerre Knudsen and Svetlana Mojsov; Alberto Ascherio and Stephen L. Hauser; and David R. Liu
  - 2025: Warren Triennial Prize – Joel Habener, Daniel J. Drucker, Jens Holst and Svetlana Mojsov
  - 2025: Member of the National Academy of Sciences
  - 2025: Distinguished Medical Science Award by the National Library of Medicine - Joel Habener, Svetlana Mojsov and Lotte Bjerre Knudsen
  - 2025: Carothers Award from the American Chemical Society Delaware Section
  - 2025: Helen Dean King Award of Wistar Institute in Philadelphia
  - 2025: Member of the Macedonian Academy of Sciences and Arts. Acceptance lecture on September 28, 2026.
  - 2026: Kimberly Prize in Biochemistry and Molecular Genetics
  - 2026: Boulder Peptide Foundation Meienhofer Award
  - 2026: King Faisal Prize in Medicine
  - 2026: Broermann Medical Innovation Award - Matthias Tschöp, Svetlana Mojsov and Richard DiMarchi
  - 2026: Clarivate Citation Laureate in Physiology or Medicine
  - 2027: Elaine Redding Brinster Prize in Science or Medicine - Svetlana Mojsov and Lotte Bjerre Knudsen

== Selected publications ==
- Mojsov, Svetlana; Merrifield, R. B. (1984–12). "An improved synthesis of crystalline mammalian glucagon". European Journal of Biochemistry. 145 (3): 601–605. doi:10.1111/j.1432-1033.1984.tb08599.x. ISSN 0014–2956.
- Mojsov, Svetlana; Gordon C. Weir; Joel F. Habener (1987). "Insulinotropin: glucagon-like peptide I (7-37) co-encoded in the glucagon gene is a potent stimulator of insulin release in the perfused rat pancreas". Journal of Clinical Investigation. 79 (2): 616–619. doi:10.1172/jci112855. PMC 424143. PMID 3543057. Wikidata Q40920945.
- Mojsov, Svetlana; G Heinrich; I B Wilson; M Ravazzola; L Orci; J F Habener (1986). "Preproglucagon gene expression in pancreas and intestine diversifies at the level of post-translational processing". Journal of Biological Chemistry. 261 (25): 11880–11889. doi:10.1016/s0021-9258(18)67324-7. PMID 3528148. Wikidata Q68895656.
- Nathan, David M; Schreiber, Eric; Fogel, Howard; Mojsov, Svetlana; Habener, Joel F (1992-02-01). "Insulinotropic Action of Glucagonlike Peptide-I-(7–37) in Diabetic and Nondiabetic Subjects". Diabetes Care. 15 (2): 270–276. doi:10.2337/diacare.15.2.270. ISSN 0149–5992

== Personal life ==
Mojsov was born in Skopje (former Yugoslavia). When she was a teenager, her family moved to Belgrade where she attended middle school and later attained her undergraduate degree at the University of Belgrade. Mojsov's father, Lazar Mojsov was a journalist, politician, and diplomat. At graduate school Mojsov met her future husband, Michel C. Nussenzweig.

== In popular culture ==
2025 - In the book Ozempic, la révolution de l'obésité ̶L’enquête, entitled A race for patents and Nobel Prizes, author Fabrice Delaye dedicates the third chapter to Mojsov. Delaye summarizes: “In 1982, the identification in animals of the slimming molecule GLP-1 triggered a fierce competition between Danish and American researchers to find it in humans.” It was in large part thanks to Mojsov's critical contribution - she was the first to identify and synthesize the correct molecule - that the American team succeeded first.

2025 - The second chapter of Off the Scales: The Inside Story of Ozempic and the Race to Cure Obesity by Aimee Donnellan focuses on Svetlana Mojsov's fundamental contribution to the discovery of GLP-1. It also details her experience with her collaborators at Massachusetts General Hospital in Boston and the challenges she has faced to be acknowledged and included in the patents.

2026 - Podcast Svetlana Mojsov: The Woman Behind GLP-1 in the series Lost Women of Science. Producers: Luke Malone and Elizabeth Corallo. Hosts: Luke Malone, Katie Hafner and Lily Whear. Guests: George Barany, Jens Juul Holst, Richard DiMarchi, Elaine Chen and Megan Molteni.
