= (acetyl-CoA carboxylase) kinase =

Class of enzymes

[acetyl-CoA carboxylase] kinase

Identifiers
- EC no.: 2.7.11.27
- CAS no.: 77000-06-7

Databases
- IntEnz: IntEnz view
- BRENDA: BRENDA entry
- ExPASy: NiceZyme view
- KEGG: KEGG entry
- MetaCyc: metabolic pathway
- PRIAM: profile
- PDB structures: RCSB PDB PDBe PDBsum
- Gene Ontology: AmiGO / QuickGO
Search
- PMC: articles
- PubMed: articles
- NCBI: proteins

In enzymology, a [acetyl-CoA carboxylase] kinase (EC 2.7.11.27) is an enzyme that catalyzes the chemical reaction

ATP + [acetyl-CoA carboxylase] $\rightleftharpoons$ ADP + [acetyl-CoA carboxylase] phosphate

Thus, the two substrates of this enzyme are ATP and acetyl-CoA carboxylase, whereas its two products are ADP and acetyl-CoA carboxylase phosphate.

This enzyme belongs to the family of transferases, specifically those transferring a phosphate group to the sidechain oxygen atom of serine or threonine residues in proteins (protein-serine/threonine kinases). The systematic name of this enzyme class is ATP:[acetyl-CoA carboxylase] phosphotransferase. Other names in common use include acetyl coenzyme A carboxylase kinase (phosphorylating), acetyl-CoA carboxylase bound kinase, acetyl-CoA carboxylase kinase, acetyl-CoA carboxylase kinase (cAMP-independent), acetyl-CoA carboxylase kinase 2, acetyl-CoA carboxylase kinase-2, acetyl-CoA carboxylase kinase-3 (AMP-activated), acetyl-coenzyme A carboxylase kinase, ACK2, ACK3, AMPK, I-peptide kinase, and STK5.
