= Joel Habener =

American endocrinologist (1937–2025)

- Born: Joel Francis Habener; June 29, 1937; Indianapolis, Indiana, U.S.
- Died: December 28, 2025 (aged 88); Newton, Massachusetts, U.S.
- Awards: Warren Alpert Foundation Prize (2020); Canada Gairdner International Award (2021); VinFuture Prize (2023); Princess of Asturias Award (2024); Tang Prize (2024); Lasker Award (2024); BBVA Foundation Frontiers of Knowledge Award (2024); Breakthrough Prize in Life Sciences (2025)
- Scientific career
- Workplaces: Harvard Medical School; Massachusetts General Hospital

Joel Francis Habener (June 29, 1937 – December 28, 2025) was an American endocrinologist who was professor of medicine at Harvard Medical School and an associate physician at the Massachusetts General Hospital.

== Early life and education ==
Habener graduated with a BS degree Cum Laude from the University of Redlands in 1960. He received his MD in 1965 from the University of California, Los Angeles, School of Medicine.

== Career ==
Habener worked with Svetlana Mojsov on elucidating the role of incretin hormones such as glucagon-like peptide-1 (GLP-1) and glucagon-like peptide-2 (GLP-2).

He was awarded the 2020 Warren Alpert Foundation Prize along with Daniel Drucker and Jens Juul Holst. He was elected to the National Academy of Sciences in 2020. In 2021, he was awarded the Canada Gairdner International Award. In 2023, he received the VinFuture Prize. In 2024, he was awarded the Princess of Asturias Award for Technical and Scientific Research, the Tang Prize in the category of "Biopharmaceutical Science", the Lasker Award for clinical research, and the BBVA Foundation Frontiers of Knowledge Award in the category "Biology and Biomedicine". In 2025 he received the Breakthrough Prize in Life Sciences.

== Death ==
Habener died in Newton, Massachusetts, on December 28, 2025, at the age of 88.
