= Dysglycemia =

Abnormality in blood glucose levels

Dysglycemia is a general definition for any abnormalities in blood glucose levels. They include hyperglycemia, hypoglycemia, impaired glucose tolerance test, impaired fasting glucose, among others.

== Hyperglycemia ==
If blood sugar levels remain too high the body suppresses appetite over the short term. Long-term hyperglycemia causes many health problems including heart disease, cancer, eye, kidney, and nerve damage.

Blood sugar levels above 300 mg/dL can cause fatal reactions. Ketones will be very high (a magnitude higher than when eating a very low carbohydrate diet) initiating ketoacidosis. The Mayo Clinic recommends emergency room treatment above 300 mg/dL blood glucose.

The most common cause of hyperglycemia is diabetes. When diabetes is the cause, physicians typically recommend an anti-diabetic medication as treatment. From the perspective of the majority of patients, treatment with an old, well-understood diabetes drug such as metformin will be the safest, most effective, least expensive, most comfortable route to managing the condition. Diet changes and exercise implementation may also be part of a treatment plan for diabetes.

== Hypoglycemia ==
Hypoglycemia is a fall in blood sugar to levels below normal. This may result in a variety of symptoms including clumsiness, trouble talking, confusion, loss of consciousness, seizures or death. A feeling of hunger, sweating, shakiness and weakness may also be present. Symptoms typically come on quickly.

The most common cause of hypoglycemia is medications used to treat diabetes mellitus such as insulin and sulfonylureas. Risk is greater in diabetics who have eaten less than usual, exercised more than usual or have drunk alcohol. Other causes of hypoglycemia include kidney failure, certain tumors (such as insulinoma), liver disease, hypothyroidism, starvation, inborn error of metabolism, severe infections, reactive hypoglycemia and a number of drugs including alcohol. Low blood sugar may occur in otherwise healthy babies who have not eaten for a few hours.
