= Anti-obesity medication =

Class of pharmacological agents

Anti-obesity medication or weight loss medications are pharmacological agents that reduce excess body fat and cause weight loss. These medications alter one of the fundamental processes of weight regulation, by: reducing appetite and consequently energy intake, increasing energy expenditure, redirecting nutrients from adipose to lean tissue, or interfering with the absorption of calories.

Weight loss drugs have been developed since the early twentieth century, and many have been banned or withdrawn from the market due to adverse effects, including deaths; other drugs proved ineffective. Although many earlier drugs were stimulants such as amphetamines, in the early 2020s, GLP-1 receptor agonists became popular for weight loss.

As of 2023, the medications liraglutide, naltrexone/bupropion, orlistat, semaglutide, tirzepatide and phentermine/topiramate are approved by the US Food and Drug Administration (FDA) for weight management in combination with reduced-calorie diet and increased physical activity. Medications to treat obesity may be considered in those with a body mass index above 30, or above 27 with obesity related complications (such as hypertension, hyperlipidemia, cardiovascular disease, or obstructive sleep apnea). As of 2022, no medication has been shown to be as effective at long-term weight reduction as bariatric surgery.

== Mechanisms of action ==
=== Energy intake ===
- 5-HT_{2C} receptor agonists reduce appetite by working on serotonin receptors in a region of the brain called the hypothalamus. Lorcaserin (Belviq) was FDA approved for weight loss but was withdrawn from the market because a safety clinical trial shows an increased occurrence of cancer.
- Cannabinoid receptor antagonists were developed to treat obesity because researchers noticed that cannabinoid agonists (such as THC, the main pharmacologically active component of cannabis), increased appetite. However, some drugs in this class such as rimonabant were withdrawn or ceased development due to concerns about mental health and suicide. More selective drugs—some are in development that act only in peripheral tissues, not the brain—may be able to achieve this result with fewer adverse effects.
- GLP-1 agonists such as tirzepatide, semaglutide, and liraglutide slow gastric emptying and also have neurologically driven effects on appetite. It is unknown if GLP-1 agonists or dual/triple agonists of GLP-1 and/or the glucagon or GIP receptors act solely by reducing energy intake or if they also increase energy expenditure.
- Setmelanotide is an agonist of the melanocortin 4 receptor and is used in people with certain rare genetic conditions that cause obesity. It is less effective and not approved for general obesity.

=== Energy expenditure ===
- Adrenergic agonists that work on the beta-2 adrenergic receptor increase energy expenditure. Although some such as clenbuterol are used without medical approval for weight loss, none have achieved approval for this indication due to cardiac risks. The anti-obesity effects of amphetamines, besides acting on the brain to reduce energy intake, are also mediated by the beta-2 adrenergic receptor. Ephedrine (and related compounds that are also active ingredients in ephedra preparations) exert their effects by acting directly and indirectly as adrenergic agonists.
- The discontinued drug 2,4-dinitrophenol works by increasing energy expenditure by decreasing the efficiency of mitochondria (uncoupling agent). A prodrug of DNP, HU6, has been tested in clinical trials for weight loss and fatty liver disease.
- Fibroblast growth factor-21 receptor agonists and drugs increasing FGF-21 activity are being investigated for obesity-related diseases; they can increase energy expenditure and several have been tested in humans.
- Thyroid hormones, another early weight loss drug, also raised energy expenditure but ceased to be used for weight loss due to cardiac risks and other adverse effects. Selective thyromimetics that work on the thyroid hormone receptor beta may be able to exert some of the beneficial thermogenic effects of thyroid hormones with fewer adverse effects, but none have received approval as of 2023.

=== Both ===
- Amylin analogues can both reduce energy intake and increase expenditure and can usefully be combined with leptin analogues for synergistic effect. The dual amylin and calcitonin receptor agonist cagrilintide, in combination with semaglutide, was more effective than semaglutide alone in promoting weight loss in clinical trials.
- Glucagon receptor agonists both reduce energy intake and increase energy expenditure in humans. They can cause hyperglycemia so it is recommended to combine them with a hypoglycemic drug, such as a GLP-1 or GIP receptor agonist.

=== Other mechanisms ===
- Bimagrumab, an experimental drug, works by inhibiting the action of myostatin, which limits the size of skeletal muscle. The drug has shown the ability to increase lean mass simultaneously to decreasing fat mass in obese humans, which is beneficial because it preserves or increases energy expenditure while reducing risks associated with excess fat.
- Orlistat (Xenical) and cetilistat are lipase inhibitors that reduce intestinal fat absorption by inhibiting pancreatic lipase, an enzyme that breaks down triglycerides in the intestine. Without this enzyme, triglycerides from the diet are prevented from being hydrolyzed into absorbable free fatty acids and are excreted undigested. Frequent oily bowel movements steatorrhea is a possible side effect of using orlistat. Originally available only by prescription, it was approved by the FDA for over-the-counter sale in February 2007.
- SGLT2 inhibitors cause the loss of 60–100 grams (2.1–3.5 oz) glucose in the urine each day and are associated with a modest, sustained weight loss of 1.5–2 kilograms (3.3–4.4 lb) in people with type 2 diabetes. The weight loss is less than expected due to compensatory increases in energy intake, but is additive when combined with GLP-1 receptor agonists.

== History ==
The first described attempts at producing weight loss are those of Soranus of Ephesus, a Greek physician, in the second century AD. He prescribed elixirs of laxatives and purgatives, as well as heat, massage, and exercise. This remained the mainstay of treatment for well over a thousand years. It was not until the 1920s and 1930s that new treatments began to appear. Based on its effectiveness for hypothyroidism, thyroid hormone became a popular treatment for obesity in euthyroid people. It had a modest effect but produced the symptoms of hyperthyroidism as a side effect, such as palpitations and difficulty sleeping. 2,4-Dinitrophenol (DNP) was introduced in 1933; this worked by uncoupling the biological process of oxidative phosphorylation in mitochondria, causing them to produce heat instead of ATP. Overdose caused fatal hyperthermia and DNP also caused cataracts in some users. After the passage of the Food, Drug, and Cosmetic Act in 1938, the FDA banned DNP for human consumption.

Amphetamines (marketed as Benzedrine) became popular for weight loss during the late 1930s. They worked primarily by suppressing appetite, and had other beneficial effects such as increased alertness. Use of amphetamines increased over the subsequent decades, including Obetrol and culminating in the "rainbow diet pill" regime. This was a combination of multiple pills, all thought to help with weight loss, taken throughout the day. Typical regimens included stimulants, such as amphetamines, as well as thyroid hormone, diuretics, digitalis, laxatives, and often a barbiturate to suppress the side effects of the stimulants. In 1967/1968 a number of deaths attributed to diet pills triggered a Senate investigation and the gradual implementation of greater restrictions on the market. While rainbow diet pills were banned in the US in the late 1960s, they reappeared in South America and Europe in the 1980s. In 1959, phentermine had been FDA approved and fenfluramine in 1973. In the early 1990s two studies found that a combination of the drugs was more effective than either on its own; fen-phen became popular in the United States and had more than 18 million prescriptions in 1996. Evidence mounted that the combination could cause valvular heart disease in up to 30 percent of those who had taken it, leading to withdrawal of fen-phen and dexfenfluramine from the market in September 1997.

In the early 2020s, GLP-1 receptor agonists such as semaglutide (Ozempic, Wegovy) or tirzepatide (Zepbound) became popular for weight loss because they are more effective than earlier drugs, causing a shortage for patients prescribed these medications for type 2 diabetes, their original indication. After the FDA approved semaglutide and tirzepatide for chronic weight management, GLP-1 medications became available through various virtual weight loss programs. GLP-1 receptor agonists are associated with reduced risk of cardiovascular events (such as heart attack and stroke) in adults with obesity.

== Patient population ==
The United States Food and Drug Administration and the European Medicines Agency have approved weight loss medications for adults with either a body-mass index (BMI) of at least 30, or a body-mass index of at least 27 with at least one weight-related comorbidity. This patient population is considered to have sufficiently high baseline health risks to justify the use of anti-obesity medication.

The American Academy of Pediatrics had not previously supported the use of weight loss medication in adolescents but issued new guidelines in 2023, which recommend considering the use of weight loss medication in some overweight children aged 12 or older. The European Medicines Agency has approved semaglutide for children aged 12 or older who have a BMI in the 95 percentile for their age and a weight of at least 60 kilograms (130 lb). However, GLP-1 agonists may not be cost effective in this population.

== Medication ==
=== US FDA approved ===
The US Food and Drug Administration (FDA) approves anti-obesity medications as an adjunctive therapy to diet and exercise for people for whom lifestyle changes do not result in sufficient weight loss. In the United States, semaglutide (Wegovy) is approved by the FDA for chronic weight management. The FDA guidelines say that a therapy may be approved if it results in weight loss that is statistically significant greater than placebo and generally at least five percent of body weight over six months that comes predominantly from fat mass. Some other prescription weight loss medications are stimulants, which are recommended only for short-term use, and thus are of limited usefulness for patients who may need to reduce weight over months or years. As of 2022, there is no pathway for approval for drugs that reduce fat mass without 5 percent overall weight loss, even if they significantly improve metabolic health; neither is there one for drugs that help patients maintain weight loss although this can be more challenging than losing weight.

As of 2022, no medication has been discovered that would equal the effectiveness of bariatric surgery for long-term weight loss and improved health outcomes.

Medication Name	Trade name(s)	Mechanism of action	Current FDA Status	placebo-adjusted percent bodyweight lost (highest dose studied)
Semaglutide	Wegovy, Ozempic	GLP-1 receptor agonist	Approved for weight management (chronic)	12 percent
Phentermine/topiramate	Qsymia	Phentermine is a substituted amphetamine, and topiramate has an unknown mechanism of action	Approved for weight management (short-term) by the FDA but not the European Medicines Agency	10 percent or 8.25 kilograms (18.2 lb)
Naltrexone/bupropion	Contrave	Reduces food cravings by inhibiting the mesolimbic system via activation of proopiomelanocortin neurons in the hypothalamus.	Approved for weight management (chronic) in the US and EU	5 percent
Liraglutide	Saxenda	GLP-1 receptor agonist	Approved for weight management (chronic)	4 percent
Gelesis100 (medical device)	Plenity	Oral hydrogel	FDA approved for weight management (chronic), but the American Gastroenterology Association recommends that its use be limited to clinical trials due to lack of evidence.	2 percent
Orlistat	Xenical	Absorption inhibitor	Approved for weight management (chronic)	3 kilograms (6.6 lb); percentage not provided
Phentermine	Adipex	Substituted amphetamine	Approved for weight management (short-term)	5 kilograms (11 lb)
Tirzepatide	Mounjaro/ Zepbound	Dual GLP-1 receptor agonist and GIP agonist	Approved for weight management (chronic)	18.4 percent

=== Withdrawn ===
Medication Name	Trade name(s)	Mechanism of action	Current FDA Status	placebo-adjusted percent bodyweight lost (highest dose studied)
Lorcaserin	Belviq	5-HT2C receptor agonist	Withdrawn for safety reasons	6.25 percent
Sibutramine	Meridia	Serotonin–norepinephrine reuptake inhibitor	Withdrawn due to cardiovascular risks	19.7 percent
Rimonabant	Acomplia, Zimulti	Cannabinoid receptor antagonist	Withdrawn in for safety reasons	2.6 to 6.3 kilograms (5.7 to 13.9 lb)
Fenfluramine	Fintepla, Pondimin	Serotonin releasing agent	Withdrawn in 1997 for safety reasons	-
Fenfluramine/phentermine (fen-phen)	Pondimin		Withdrawn in 1997 for safety reasons	13.9 percent
Dexfenfluramine	Redux	Serotonin releasing agent	Withdrawn in 1997 for safety reasons	3.5 kilograms (7.7 lb)
2,4-Dinitrophenol		Uncoupling agent	Withdrawn for safety reasons	17.1 pounds (7.8 kg) per patient on average (uncontrolled study)
Ephedrine		Adrenergic agonist	Approved for asthma	Average of 1.9 kilograms (4.2 lb) in a meta-analysis (all dosages)
ECA stack		Combination of ephedrine and caffeine, sometimes adding aspirin		Around 4–6 kilograms (8.8–13.2 lb)
Ephedra	Plant extract sold as a dietary supplement	Contains ephedrine, an adrenergic agonist	Banned in 2004 for safety reasons	0.9 kilograms (2.0 lb) per month more than placebo
Amphetamine salts	Obetrol		Approved 1960, withdrawn 1973; Adderall was later approved for ADHD and narcolepsy and is still used for those purposes	
Phenylpropanolamine	Was an over-the-counter medication ingredient		Withdrawn in 2005 due to risk of hemorrhagic stroke	1.5 kilograms (3.3 lb)

=== Never approved or not currently approved ===
Medication Name	Trade name(s)	Mechanism of action	Current FDA Status	placebo-adjusted percent bodyweight lost (highest dose studied)
Retatrutide		GLP-1, GIP, and glucagon receptor triple agonist	In clinical trials	24 percent in a phase II trial
UBT251		GLP-1, GIP, and glucagon receptor triple agonist	In clinical trials	19.7 percent in a phase II trial
Exenatide	Byetta	GLP-1 receptor agonist	Approved for type 2 diabetes	2.5 kilograms (5.5 lb)
Cetilistat		Absorption inhibitor	Not approved	1.5 kilograms (3.3 lb)
Tesofensine (NS2330)		Serotonin–norepinephrine–dopamine reuptake inhibitor	Not FDA approved	10.6 percent
Metformin	Glucophage	Unknown	Approved for type 2 diabetes	5.6 percent
Cagrilintide		Dual amylin and calcitonin receptor agonist (DACRA)	Not approved	7.8 percent
Cagrilintide/semaglutide	CagriSema	DACRA/GLP-1 agonist combination	Not approved	20.4 percent in phase III trial
VK2735		Dual GLP-1 and GIP receptor agonist	In phase 3 clinical trials	14.7 percent in a phase II trial.
Survodutide		Dual GLP-1 and GIP receptor agonist	In phase 3 clinical trials	16.6 percent in a phase III trial.

== Safety and side effects ==
Some anti-obesity medications can have severe, even lethal side effects, fen-phen being a famous example. Fen-phen was reported through the FDA to cause abnormal echocardiograms, heart valve problems, and rare valvular diseases. Out of 25 anti-obesity medications withdrawn from the market between 1964 and 2009, 23 acted by altering the functions of chemical neurotransmitters in the brain. The most common side effects of these drugs that led to withdrawals were mental disturbances, cardiac side effects, and drug abuse or drug dependence. GLP-1 receptor agonists are known to have common side effects including nausea and vomiting. Deaths were associated with seven products. Ephedra was removed from the US market in 2004 over concerns that it raises blood pressure and could lead to strokes and death.

=== Weight regain ===
Weight regain is common upon discontinuation of weight loss medications, and long-term therapy may sometimes be required for sustained weight loss. After stopping treatment with GLP-1 agonists such as semaglutide, liraglutide and tirzepatide, people regain on average more than half (50–70%) of the lost weight within 1 year.

People return to their previous weight within a year and a half after stopping anti-obesity medications.
