= Lipase inhibitor =

Class of pharmaceutical drugs

- Drug class
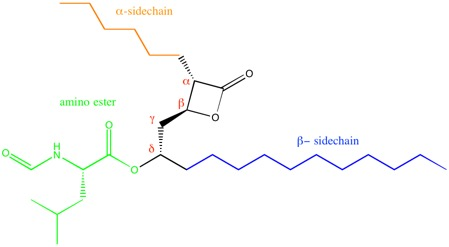
- Chemical structure of the lipase inhibitor Orlistat

Class identifiers
- ATC code: A08AB
- Mode of action: Inhibits gastric lipase and pancreatic lipase

Legal status

Lipase inhibitors are substances used to reduce the activity of lipases found in the intestine. Lipases are a family of enzymes secreted by the pancreas when fat is present. They break down triglycerides, producing free fatty acids and glycerol that are absorbed by the small intestine. As key players in this process, lipases are crucial enzymes for the digestion and absorption of fat-soluble vitamins. Lipase inhibitors act as functional antagonists of lipases. They decrease the gastrointestinal breakdown of fats, resulting in the excretion of fats in feces. By preventing fat absorption and the use of fats as a source of caloric energy, lipase inhibitors promote weight loss. The inhibitors mainly target the pancreatic lipase, although some drugs have secondary effects on other lipases. For the past two decades, these inhibitors have been used for longterm treatment of obesity, mitigating the risk of Type 2 diabetes and cardiovascular diseases that can result from unmanaged obesity. The only FDA-approved lipase inhibitor currently on the market, available both as a prescription drug and over-the-counter, is orlistat, a natural product derived from lipstatin of Streptomyces toxytricini.

== Medical Uses ==
Lipase inhibitors are primarily used as a treatment for obesity and related conditions. In recent years, new applications have been proposed, but are still being researched. Recent research shows the potential for using lipase inhibitors for non-alcoholic fatty liver disease (NAFLD) treatment.

=== Obesity Management ===
Further reading: Obesity

Obesity is a complex chronic condition characterized by an accumulated excess of body fat that results in negative effects on individual health. This health condition is a global phenomenon, but has become particularly common in the United States, as roughly a third of the population is affected. While lifestyle changes are often the first administered form of treatment, pharmacotherapy and surgical interventions are secondarily employed strategies. Lipase inhibitors are a type of pharmacological intervention against obesity, with orlistat being the most common commercially available kind in the United States.

=== Side Effects ===
Lipase inhibitors can cause side effects, including oily spotting, fecal incontinence, flatus with discharge and abdominal cramping. Additionally, a raise in blood pressure, dry mouth, constipation, headache, and insomnia have been reported. Malabsorption of fat soluble vitamins may develop as a result of the impaired absorption of fat, which is required for the transportation of these vitamins across the intestine to reach the blood. Since lipase inhibitors are not absorbed in the intestine, and consequently not circulating in the blood, information about alternative side effects is unobtainable. Generally, side effects can be controlled by reducing the consumption of dietary fats. Overall, orlistat has been considered to be safer than other anti-obesity drugs.

Because lipase inhibitors interfere with the absorption of fat, they can also prevent the absorption of fat-soluble vitamins. It is recommended that multi-vitamins are taken along with lipase inhibitors, so vitamin deficiency doesn't occur.

== Mechanism ==
Lipase inhibitors may affect the amount of fat absorbed, yet they do not block the absorption of a particular type of fat. Likewise, lipase inhibitors are not absorbed into the bloodstream. Lipase inhibitors bind to lipase enzymes in the intestine, thus preventing the hydrolysis of dietary triglycerides into monoglycerides and fatty acids. This then reduces the absorption of dietary fat. Lipase inhibitors covalently bond to the active serine site on lipases. This covalent bond is strong, meaning the lipase inhibitor tends to remain attached to the lipase. Studies have shown that lipase inhibitors work optimally when 40% of an individual's daily caloric intake is obtained from fat. Orlistat tends to block absorption of 30% of total fat intake from a meal, as orlistat passes out of the digestive tract more rapidly than fat does.

== Pharmacology ==
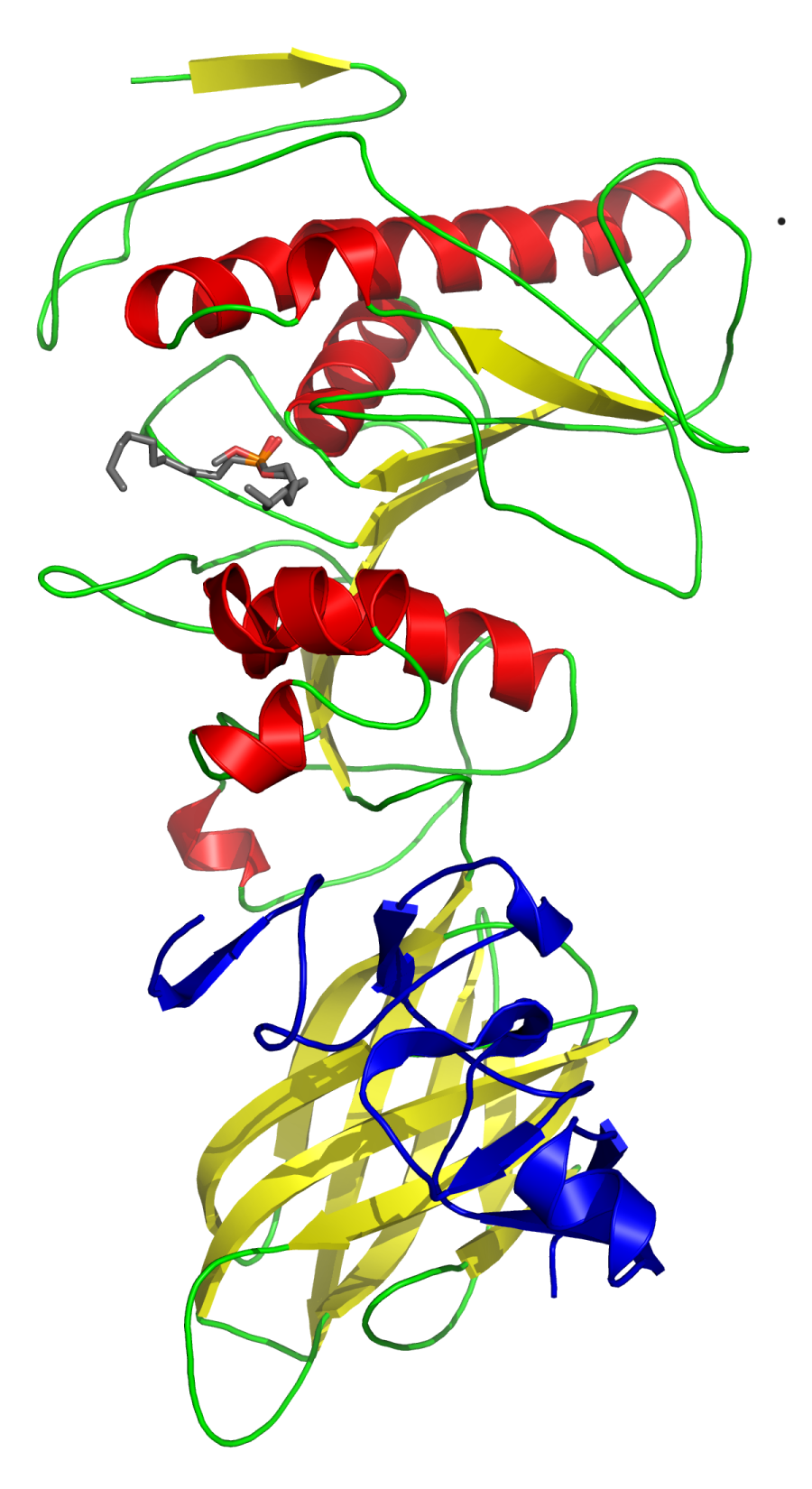
Pancreatic lipase - colipase complex with inhibitor 1LPB. An example of a potential lipase inhibitor drug target.

=== Lipase Fat Absorption ===
Lipase inhibitors disrupt the established mode of action of lipases during the fat absorption mechanism. In a healthy body, lipases catabolize dietary lipids that enter the digestive system through nutrition. Once a lipid molecule encounters a lipase, the enzyme undergoes a conformational change to break down the lipid. Lipases have an open and a closed conformation. The active site, which interacts with the lipid molecules to chemically degrade them, is blocked off by a lid of amino acids. The lid opens when the lipase comes into contact with lipids, shifting aside to reveal a hydrophobic docking site for the lipid molecule. Colipase, a cofactor that guides the initial interaction between the lipase and lipids, is responsible for the successful opening of the lid.

Lipases catabolize lipids via serine hydrolysis. Serine hydrolases are a class of enzymes that share a key structural motif: the serine-histidine-aspartate (Ser-His-Asp) catalytic triad. In the pancreatic lipase, these three amino acids are located in positions 152, 263, and 176, respectively. When breaking down a lipid molecule, Ser152 acts as the nucleophile that attacks the ester backbone bond of the lipid triglyceride, resulting in a tetrahedral intermediate that subsequently collapses into an acyl-enzyme structure. Lastly, His263 recruits water to deacylate the intermediate, regenerating Ser152. One of the crucial characteristics of this reaction is the high regiospecificity of the enzyme, which specifically cleaves the outer ester bonds of triacylglycerol. The middle ester bond is left intact, resulting in two free fatty acids and a 2-monoacylglycerol.

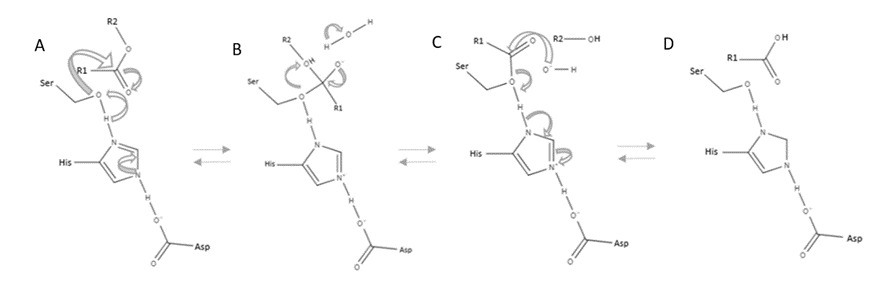
The catalytic mechanism of lipases.

=== Lipase Inhibitors ===
The mechanism of action of lipase inhibitors varies depending on the specific subtype of inhibitors. However, research has shown that the two primary biochemical targets of lipase inhibitors are the high affinity of lipases for the hydrophobic substrate binding and selective engagement of lipases with the serine-histidine-aspartate (Ser-His-Asp) catalytic triad.

==== Hydrophobic Substrate Binding ====
Molecular docking site analyses and molecular dynamics simulations show that designing drugs with high proportions of hydrophobic amino acids can effectively inhibit pancreatic lipases. Inserting hydrophobic amino acids allows drug molecules to occupy the enzyme's active site, which binds substrates via hydrophobic interactions. By blocking off the substrate binding site, the central function of lipases is inhibited.

==== Engagement with the Catalytic Triad ====
Molecular docking site analyses also demonstrate that drugs with components that can engage in bonding interactions with the catalytic triad of the pancreatic lipase can successfully inhibit the enzyme's function. For example, orlistat operates by inserting its active β-lactone ring into the close proximity of the hydroxyl group of Ser152. This positioning allows for the creation of a covalent bond between Ser152 and the drug, directly blocking any opportunities for nucleophilic attack on the substrate. In this manner, orlistat inhibits the breakdown of lipids by lipase.

== Classes of Lipase Inhibitors ==
Due to the diversity of mechanistic approaches to inhibiting lipases, the respective structures of inhibitor subtypes also largely vary. However, they can be categorized into classes by their mechanism of targeting lipase to investigate their general structural components and distinct characteristics.

=== β-Lactones ===
Further reading: Orlistat

The general structure of β-lactones.

β-Lactones are organic compounds that feature a four-membered ring with high ring-strain. They are members of a broader class of organic molecules called lactones, which are cyclic esters. Lactones are the products of an intramolecular condensation of a hydroxyl and carbonyl group. Five-membered (γ) and six-membered (δ) lactones are among the most stable lactone structures, while β-lactone is highly reactive. Moreover, the carbonyl bond of β-lactone is very electrophilic, making the structure an extremely favorable target for the Ser152 nucleophilic attack. By mimicking this key structural motifs of lipids, β-lactones are ideal competitive inhibitors. In addition to the cyclic ester, β-lactones contain long aliphatic side chains that mimic another central feature of triacylglycerides: the fatty acid tails.

Due to their powerful covalent interactions with lipases, the reaction between β-lactones and lipases is irreversible, leading to a broad suppression of fat digestion and some negative side effects. However, despite the imperfect mechanism of action of β-lactones, orlistat, the only FDA-approved lipase inhibitor, is a β-lactone based medication.

=== Flavonoids ===
The general structure of flavonoids.

Flavonoids are organic compounds that are naturally present in plants. They have phenolic components, including two aromatic rings and a six-membered ether-containing ring with varying degrees of unsaturation. Flavonoids can be further categorized as flavones, isoflavones, flavonols, and more, depending on the structure of the third ring. Their large conjugated π-systems and polar oxygen-containing parts make them competent lipase inhibitors. The conjugated π-system stacks with the aromatic amino acid side chains of lipase (particularly Phe77 ahd Tyr114), while their oxygen functional groups participate in hydrogen bonding with the peptide backbone of lipase. An important advantage of flavonoids as lipase inhibitors is that their effect can be reversible, making them a popular avenue of research.

=== Aurones ===
The general structure of aurones.

Aurones, also known as 2-benzylidene-1-benzofuran-3(2H)-ones, are a subclass of natural flavonoids. They are composed of a very similar structure as flavonoids, containing three rings. However, the oxygen-containing ring is five-membered in the case of aurones. Beyond their use as lipase inhibitors, aurones have been shown to be biologically active against inflammation, bacterial infections, malaria, cancer, and other diseases. The benzofuranone double ring component is the primary chemically active site that participates in enzymatic reactions. The structure of aurones also supports π-π stacking interactions with aromatic amino acids, in a similar manner as flavonoids.

== Sources ==
Lipase inhibitors can be found naturally in plants and can also be produced as pharmaceutical drugs. Some lipase inhibitors have been identified in Panax ginseng. Some active compounds with chalcone scaffold found in Glycyrrhiza glabra, Cassia mimosoides, Glycyrrhiza uralensis, Boesenbergia rotunda, apples and Morus alba also had strong effect against lipase. Caffeine, theobromine and theophylline were also supposed as lipase inhibitors although they are still controversial.

== See also ==
- Discovery and development of gastrointestinal lipase inhibitors
