= Anal leakage =

Anal leakage may refer to:

- Steatorrhea, a type of oily anal discharge
- Keriorrhea, a type of oily discharge caused by eating deep sea fish containing wax esters
- Fecal incontinence, liquid fecal incontinence is a sub-type of fecal incontinence
- Fecal leakage, a type of fecal incontinence causing minor staining of undergarments in adults
- Encopresis, liquid fecal soiling and fecal incontinence in children

== See also ==
- Rectal discharge
