= Wax-ester hydrolase =

wax-ester hydrolase

Identifiers
- EC no.: 3.1.1.50
- CAS no.: 66625-78-3

Databases
- IntEnz: IntEnz view
- BRENDA: BRENDA entry
- ExPASy: NiceZyme view
- KEGG: KEGG entry
- MetaCyc: metabolic pathway
- PRIAM: profile
- PDB structures: RCSB PDB PDBe PDBsum
- Gene Ontology: AmiGO / QuickGO
Search
- PMC: articles
- PubMed: articles
- NCBI: proteins

The enzyme wax-ester hydrolase (EC 3.1.1.50) catalyzes the reaction

a wax ester + H_{2}O $\rightleftharpoons$ a long-chain alcohol + a long-chain carboxylate

Thus, the two substrates of this enzyme are wax ester and H_{2}O, whereas its two products are long-chain alcohol and long-chain carboxylate.

This enzyme belongs to the family of hydrolases, specifically those acting on carboxylic ester bonds. The systematic name of this enzyme class is wax-ester acylhydrolase. Other names in common use include jojoba wax esterase, and WEH.
