= Cenekal =

Cenekal may refer to:

- Senekal, town in South Africa
- Xenical, drug
