= Cenecal =

Cenecal may refer to:

- Senekal, town in South Africa
- Xenical, drug
