= Steatocrit =

Test for steatorrhea

Steatocrit or acid steatocrit is a simple, rapid gravimetric method to determine steatorrhea. The test is simple, rapid, inexpensive, and reliable. It is a qualitative test that can be used when other methods are impractical.

== Elevated steatocrit ==
An elevated steatocrit is indicative of fat malabsorption resulting in steatorrhea. This generally results from pancreatic exocrine insufficiency but can also occur with severe small bowel disease i.e. celiac disease, liver diseases such as Primary Biliary Cirrhosis or medications that inhibit fat absorption such as orlistat.

== See also ==
- Medical test
- Steatorrhea
- Stool tests
- Gastroenterology
- Chronic pancreatitis
- Malabsorption syndrome
