= Vibralactone =

Vibralactones are a group of related terpenoid chemical compounds, the first of which were isolated from the Basidiomycete Boreostereum vibrans in 2006. Additional vibralactones have also been isolated from the fungus Stereum hirsutum.

Vibralactone A has attracted research interest because it is an inhibitor of pancreatic lipase (IC_{50} 0.4 μg/mL) with in vitro activity comparable to that of the obesity drug orlistat.

Several laboratory syntheses of vibralactone A have been developed.

== Chemical structures ==
| Vibralactone A | Vibralactone B | Vibralactone C |
| Vibralactone D | Vibralactone E | Vibralactone F |
