= Cetilistat =

Chemical compound

Clinical data
- ATC code: none

Identifiers
- IUPAC name: 2-(Hexadecyloxy)-6-methyl-4H-3,1-benzoxazin-4-one
- CAS Number: 282526-98-1
- PubChem CID: 9952916
- ChemSpider: 8128526
- UNII: LC5G1JUA39
- KEGG: D09208
- ChEMBL: ChEMBL2103825
- CompTox Dashboard (EPA): DTXSID90182506

Chemical and physical data
- Formula: C_{25}H_{39}NO_{3}
- Molar mass: 401.591 g·mol^{−1}
- 3D model (JSmol): Interactive image
- SMILES: CCCCCCCCCCCCCCCCOc2oc(=O)c1cc(C)ccc1n2
- InChI: InChI=1S/C25H39NO3/c1-3-4-5-6-7-8-9-10-11-12-13-14-15-16-19-28-25-26-23-18-17-21(2)20-22(23)24(27)29-25/h17-18,20H,3-16,19H2,1-2H3; Key:MVCQKIKWYUURMU-UHFFFAOYSA-N

Cetilistat is a drug designed to treat obesity. It acts in the same way as the older drug orlistat (Xenical) by inhibiting pancreatic lipase, an enzyme that breaks down triglycerides in the intestine. Without this enzyme, triglycerides from the diet are prevented from being hydrolyzed into absorbable free fatty acids and are excreted undigested.

In human trials from 2007, cetilistat was shown to produce similar weight loss to orlistat, but also produced similar side effects such as oily, loose stools, fecal incontinence, frequent bowel movements, and flatulence. It is likely that the same precautions would apply in that absorption of fat-soluble vitamins and other fat-soluble nutrients may be inhibited, requiring vitamin supplements to be used to avoid deficiencies.

Cetilistat completed Phase 1 and 2 trials in the West and as of 2009 was in Phase 3 trials in Japan where it was partnered with Takeda. Norgine BV acquired the full global rights to cetilistat from Alizyme after the latter went into administration.

In 2010, a phase 2 trial found cetilistat significantly reduced weight and was better tolerated than orlistat.

Takeda gained approval to market Cetilistat in Japan, but terminated the license agreement with Norgine in 2018.

== See also ==
- Anti-obesity medication
