= Enterostatin =

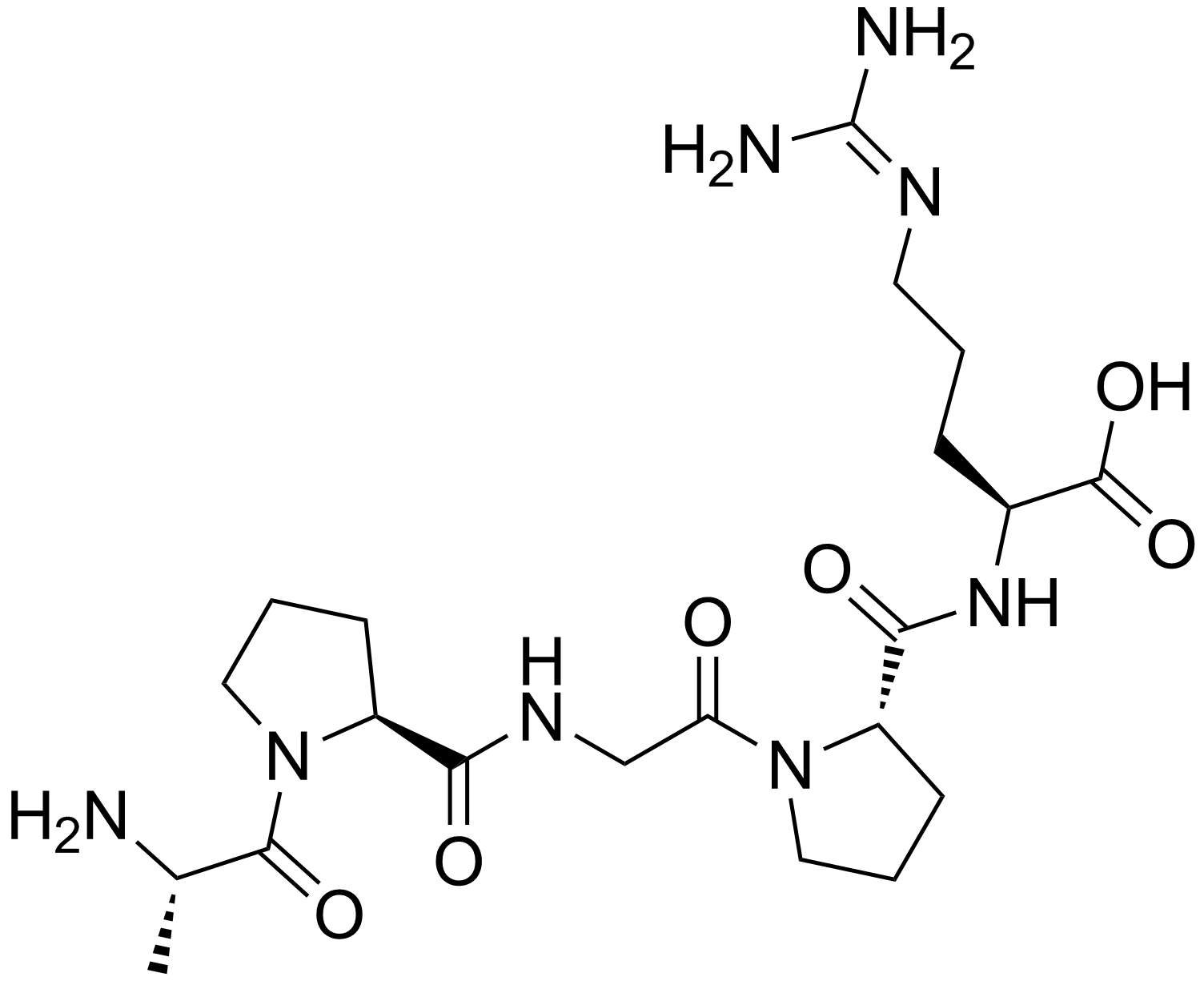

Names
- IUPAC name (2S)-2-[[(2S)-1-[2-[[(2S)-1-[(2S)-2-aminopropanoyl]pyrrolidine-2-carbonyl]amino]acetyl]pyrrolidine-2-carbonyl]amino]-5-(diaminomethylideneamino)pentanoic acid
- Other names Procolipase activation peptide; APGPR; L-Alanyl-L-prolylglycyl-L-prolyl-L-arginine

Identifiers
CAS Number	117830-79-2
3D model (JSmol)	Interactive image
ChemSpider	2340236
PubChem CID	3082883
UNII	C9R6HY7YRT
CompTox Dashboard (EPA)	DTXSID20151927
- InChI: InChI=1S/C21H36N8O6/c1-12(22)19(33)29-10-4-6-14(29)17(31)26-11-16(30)28-9-3-7-15(28)18(32)27-13(20(34)35)5-2-8-25-21(23)24/h12-15H,2-11,22H2,1H3,(H,26,31)(H,27,32)(H,34,35)(H4,23,24,25)/t12-,13-,14-,15-/m0/s1 Key: ITZMJCSORYKOSI-AJNGGQMLSA-N; InChI=1/C21H36N8O6/c1-12(22)19(33)29-10-4-6-14(29)17(31)26-11-16(30)28-9-3-7-15(28)18(32)27-13(20(34)35)5-2-8-25-21(23)24/h12-15H,2-11,22H2,1H3,(H,26,31)(H,27,32)(H,34,35)(H4,23,24,25)/t12-,13-,14-,15-/m0/s1 Key: ITZMJCSORYKOSI-AJNGGQMLBF
- SMILES: O=C(N[C@H](C(=O)O)CCC/N=C(\N)N)[C@H]2N(C(=O)CNC(=O)[C@H]1N(C(=O)[C@@H](N)C)CCC1)CCC2

Properties
Chemical formula	C_{21}H_{36}N_{8}O_{6}
Molar mass	496.569 g·mol^{−1}
- Except where otherwise noted, data are given for materials in their standard state (at 25 °C [77 °F], 100 kPa). verify (what is ?) Infobox references

Enterostatin is a pentapeptide derived from a proenzyme in the gastrointestinal tract called procolipase. It reduces food intake, in particular fat intake, when given peripherally or into the brain.

== Chemical structure ==
Enterostatin has the sequence Val-Pro-Asp-Pro-Arg in most mammals, but Val-Pro-Gly-Pro-Arg or Val-Pro-Asp-Pro-Arg in rodents and Ala-Pro-Gly-Pro-Arg in humans. The sequence that it necessary for its anorexic effects is X-pro-Y-pro-arg and conserved among several vertebrate species.

== Function ==
Enterostatin has been detected in gut endocrine cells. It is created in the intestine by pancreatic procolipase, the other colipase serving as an obligatory cofactor for pancreatic lipase during fat digestion. Enterostatin can be created in the gastric mucosa and the mucosal epithelia in the small intestine. A high fat diet will cause the procolipase gene transcription and enterostatin to release into the gastrointestinal lumen. Enterostatin appears in the lymph and circulation after a meal. Enterostatin has been shown to selectively reduce fat intake during a normal meal. The testing has been successful with different species.

== Signaling pathway ==
The signaling pathway of the peripheral mechanism uses afferent vagal to hypothalamic centers. The central responses are mediated through a pathway including serotonergic and opioidergic components. Enterostatin cuts fat intake, bodyweight, and body fat. This reaction may involve multiple metabolic effects of enterostatin, which include a decrease of insulin secretion, a growth in sympathetic drive to brown adipose tissue, and the stimulation of adrenal corticosteroid secretion. It has been demonstrated that enterostatin stimulates neurons in the amygdala, the arcuate nucleus, the lateral and the ventromedial hypothalamus that have anatomic and functional projections to the paraventricular nucleus (PVN) of the hypothalamus. Additionally, enterostatin regulates the expression of Agouti-related peptide (AgRP) in a complex manner.

A possible pathophysiological role is indicated by studies that have associated low enterostatin output and/or responsiveness to breeds of rat that become obese and prefer dietary fat. Humans with obesity also exhibit a lower secretion from pancreatic procolipase after a test meal, compared with persons of normal weight.

== Effects ==
Its effects include a reduction of insulin secretion, an increase in sympathetic drive to brown adipose tissue, and the stimulation of adrenal corticosteroid secretion. At the end level, it initiates a sensation of fullness of stomach which could be the reason for its role in regulation of fat intake and reduction of body weight. For enterostatin to be utilized it needs the presence of CCK A receptors. Studies based on rats who lack these receptors have found them to be un-responsive to enterostatin.

When rats have been injected with high doses of enterostatin into the brain the rats ate progressively less food as the dose was increased. In rats, examination of experiments involving the effects of peripheral or intracerebroventricular administration of enterostatin show this selectively slows down fat consumption.

== Medical trials ==
Although enterostatin-like immunoreactivities exist in blood, brain, and gut, and exogenous enterostatins decrease fat appetite and insulin secretion in rats, the roles of these peptides in human obesity remain to be examined. It has been hypothesized that resistance to enterostatin impairs its effects in obesity.
