= Dual amylin and calcitonin receptor agonists =

Drug class

Dual amylin and calcitonin receptor agonists (DACRAs) are a class of drugs that act as agonists at the amylin receptor and calcitonin receptor that are under development as therapies for obesity and type 2 diabetes. Examples are cagrilintide, Petrelintide, ACCG-2671 and the KBP family derived from salmon calcitonin, including KBP‐042, KBP-066A, KBP-089, and KBP-336.
