= Cagrilintide/semaglutide =

Combination drug

Combination of
- Cagrilintide: Amylin receptor agonist
- Semaglutide: GLP-1 receptor agonist

Clinical data
- Trade names: CagriSema

Cagrilintide/semaglutide, known as CagriSema, is a combination of cagrilintide, a dual amylin and calcitonin receptor agonist, and semaglutide, a GLP-1 agonist. It has been proposed as a follow-on to semaglutide (alone) or tirzepatide in treatments for obesity and type II diabetes.

== Applications ==
CagriSema is under investigation to treat type 2 diabetes and obesity. In trials, it resulted in greater absolute weight loss in kilograms and decrease in blood pressure than semaglutide alone and placebo.

HbA1c was significantly improved compared to cagrilintide alone and non-significantly better than semaglutide alone. In a Phase II trial, weight loss averaged -15.6 percent after 32 weeks, comparable in efficacy to tirzepatide.

== Trials ==
CagriSema entered Phase III clinical trials in 2023.

=== REDEFINE 1 ===
In June 2025, results were published in The New England Journal of Medicine on REDEFINE 1, a 68-week, double-blind, Phase III clinical trial enrolling 3,417 participants, testing weekly cagrilintide 2.4 mg and semaglutide 2.4 mg individually and together versus placebo in obese/overweight subjects with comorbidities. People treated with CagriSema lost 20.4% of their body weight over 68 weeks, versus 11.5% with cagrilintide 2.4 mg alone, 14.9% with semaglutide 2.4 mg alone, and 3.0% with placebo.

=== REDEFINE 2 ===
In June 2025, results were published in The New England Journal of Medicine on REDEFINE 2, a 68-week, double-blind, Phase III clinical trial enrolling 1,206 participants. REDEFINE 2 reported that obese or overweight adult patients with type 2 diabetes lost 13.7% of their weight over 68 weeks with Cagrilintide/semaglutide, compared with 3.1% with placebo.

=== REDEFINE 5 ===
In April 2026, results were published in The Lancet on REDEFINE 5, a 68-week, double-blind, phase 3a clinical trial enrolling 331 participants. The study findings report that participants in the CagriSema cohort had an estimated mean bodyweight change of -18.4%, versus -11.7% for participants in the semaglutide cohort.
