= Lipstatin =

Names
- Systematic IUPAC name (2S,4Z,7Z)-1-[(2S,3S)-3-Hexyl-4-oxooxetan-2-yl]trideca-4,7-dien-2-yl (2S)-2-formamido-4-methylpentanoate
- Other names (2S,4Z,7Z)-1-[(2S,3S)-3-Hexyl-4-oxo-2-oxetanyl]-4,7-tridecadien-2-yl N-formyl-L-leucinate

Identifiers
CAS Number	96829-59-3
3D model (JSmol)	Interactive image
ChemSpider	7981411
ECHA InfoCard	100.126.007
MeSH	Lipstatin
PubChem CID	9805651
UNII	UBD38W8LEW
CompTox Dashboard (EPA)	DTXSID50897604
- InChI: InChI=1S/C29H49NO5/c1-5-7-9-11-12-13-14-15-16-18-24(34-29(33)26(30-22-31)20-23(3)4)21-27-25(28(32)35-27)19-17-10-8-6-2/h12-13,15-16,22-27H,5-11,14,17-21H2,1-4H3,(H,30,31)/b13-12-,16-15-/t24-,25-,26-,27-/m0/s1 Key: OQMAKWGYQLJJIA-CUOOPAIESA-N; InChI=1/C29H49NO5/c1-5-7-9-11-12-13-14-15-16-18-24(34-29(33)26(30-22-31)20-23(3)4)21-27-25(28(32)35-27)19-17-10-8-6-2/h12-13,15-16,22-27H,5-11,14,17-21H2,1-4H3,(H,30,31)/b13-12-,16-15-/t24-,25-,26-,27-/m0/s1 Key: OQMAKWGYQLJJIA-CUOOPAIEBU
- SMILES: O=C(O[C@H](C[C@@H]1OC(=O)[C@H]1CCCCCC)C\C=C/C\C=C/CCCCC)[C@@H](NC=O)CC(C)C

Properties
Chemical formula	C_{29}H_{49}NO_{5}
Molar mass	491.713 g·mol^{−1}
- Except where otherwise noted, data are given for materials in their standard state (at 25 °C [77 °F], 100 kPa). verify (what is ?) Infobox references

Lipstatin is a potent, irreversible inhibitor of pancreatic lipase. It is a natural product that was first isolated from the actinobacterium Streptomyces toxytricini.

The popular antiobesity drug orlistat (trade names Xenical and alli) is a saturated derivative of lipstatin.

== Biosynthesis ==
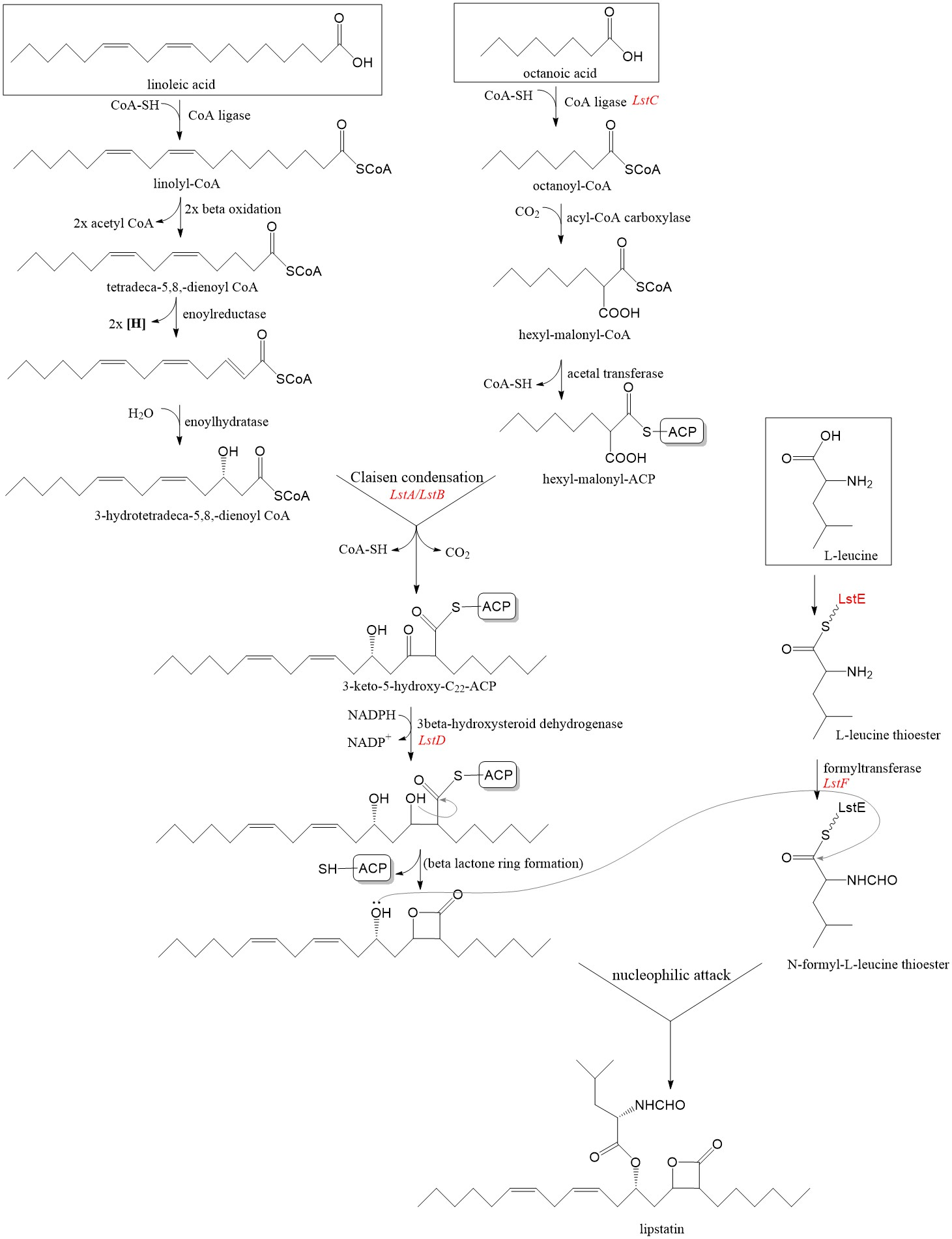
Lipstatin biosynthesis pathway in Streptomyces toxytricini.

Lipstatin is composed of a 2-hexyl-3,5-dihydroxy-7,10-hexadecadienoic-β-lactone 22 carbon backbone from fatty acid synthesis pathway and an N-formyl-L-leucine group ester linked to the 5-hydroxyl group of the back bone. The composts of the lipstatin are ultimately from linoleic acid, octanoic acid, and L-leucine.

The 22 carbon β-lactone moiety is derived from Claisen condensation between 3-hydroxytetradeca-5,8-dienyl-CoA derived from linoleic acid and hexyl-malonyl-ACP derived from octanoic acid.Linoleic acid is first attached to CoA through some acyl-CoA synthetase homologue synthesized by lipstatin biosynthetic operons (Lst) and goes through two β-oxidation to hydroxytetradeca-5,8-dienyl-CoA. 3’ hydroxyl group from solution H_{2}O is added by enoyl reductase homologue followed by enoyl hydratase homologue. Octanoic acid is also attached to CoA through similar acyl-CoA synthetase homologue (LstC) to form octanoyl-CoA. Octanoyl-CoA is 2’ carboxylated and loaded to acyl carrier protein (ACP) borrowed from primary metabolism to form hexyl-malonyl-ACP.

The β-lactone ring is formed by reduction of 3-keto group by 3-hydroxysteroid dehydrogenase homologue followed by a spontaneously nucleophilic attack of the 3-hydroxyl group on the carbonyl of the ACP-tether acyl intermediate. This step follows the esterification of the N-formyl-L-leucine group.

The N-formyl-L-leucine group is derived from L-leucine. L-leucine was activated by LstE forming thioester and its α-amine group is formylated by LstF. Finally, 5-hydroxyl of 22 carbon β-lactone backbone nucleophilic attacks on the acyl carbon of the formyl-leucine and forms the lipstatin.

== See also ==
- Discovery and development of gastrointestinal lipase inhibitors
