= Survodutide =

Peptide drug

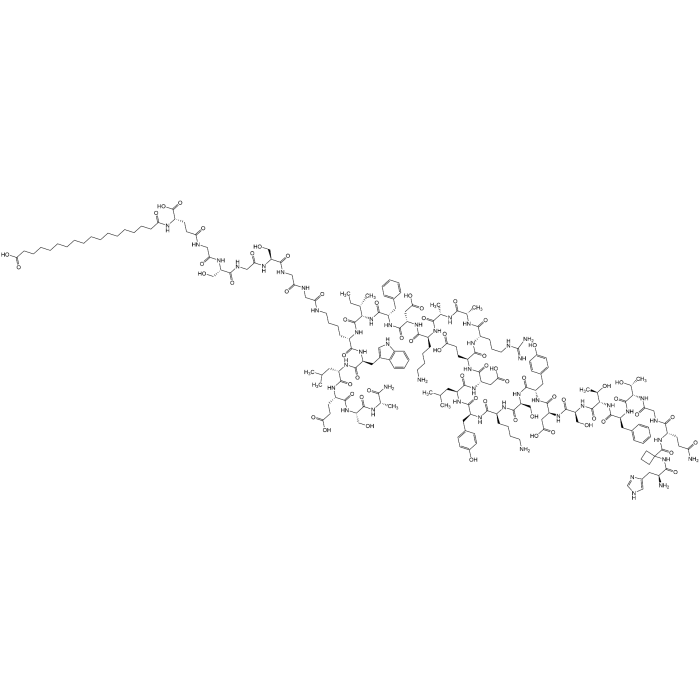

Clinical data
- Other names: BI 456906; EX-A7878

Identifiers
- CAS Number: 2805997-46-8
- PubChem CID: 168429725
- UNII: 2ALA66NS64
- KEGG: D12898

Chemical and physical data
- Formula: C_{192}H_{289}N_{47}O_{61}
- Molar mass: 4231.692 g·mol^{−1}
- SMILES: CC[C@H](C)[C@@H](C(=O)N[C@H](CCCCNC(=O)CNC(=O)CNC(=O)[C@@H](CO)NC(=O)CNC(=O)[C@@H](CO)NC(=O)CNC(=O)CCC(C(=O)O)NC(=O)CCCCCCCCCCCCCCCCC(=O)O)C(=O)N[C@H](CC1=CNC2=CC=CC=C21)C(=O)N[C@H](CC(C)C)C(=O)N[C@H](CCC(=O)O)C(=O)N[C@H](CO)C(=O)N[C@H](C)C(=O)N)NC(=O)[C@H](CC3=CC=CC=C3)NC(=O)[C@H](CC(=O)O)NC(=O)[C@H](CCCCN)NC(=O)[C@H](C)NC(=O)[C@H](C)NC(=O)[C@H](CCCNC(=N)N)NC(=O)[C@H](CCC(=O)O)NC(=O)[C@H](CC(=O)O)NC(=O)[C@H](CC(C)C)NC(=O)[C@@H](CC4=CC=C(C=C4)O)NC(=O)[C@H](CCCCN)NC(=O)[C@H](CO)NC(=O)[C@H](CC5=CC=C(C=C5)O)NC(=O)[C@H](CC(=O)O)NC(=O)[C@H](CO)NC(=O)[C@H]([C@@H](C)O)NC(=O)[C@H](CC6=CC=CC=C6)NC(=O)[C@H]([C@@H](C)O)NC(=O)CNC(=O)[C@H](CCC(=O)N)NC(=O)C7(CCC7)NC(=O)[C@H](CC8=CNC=N8)N
- InChI: InChI=1S/C192H289N47O61/c1-12-103(6)157(186(295)221-122(170(279)227-134(83-113-88-203-119-48-34-33-47-117(113)119)177(286)223-128(77-101(2)3)173(282)219-126(66-70-153(261)262)172(281)232-140(97-242)183(292)210-104(7)160(197)269)51-37-40-75-201-146(252)90-205-147(253)91-206-165(274)138(95-240)215-149(255)93-208-166(275)139(96-241)214-148(254)92-204-144(250)68-64-127(189(298)299)213-145(251)53-31-23-21-19-17-15-13-14-16-18-20-22-24-32-54-151(257)258)237-181(290)132(79-109-43-27-25-28-44-109)226-179(288)136(86-155(265)266)228-168(277)120(49-35-38-73-193)216-162(271)106(9)211-161(270)105(8)212-167(276)123(52-41-76-202-191(198)199)217-171(280)125(65-69-152(259)260)220-178(287)135(85-154(263)264)229-174(283)129(78-102(4)5)222-175(284)130(81-111-55-59-115(247)60-56-111)224-169(278)121(50-36-39-74-194)218-184(293)141(98-243)233-176(285)131(82-112-57-61-116(248)62-58-112)225-180(289)137(87-156(267)268)230-185(294)142(99-244)234-188(297)159(108(11)246)238-182(291)133(80-110-45-29-26-30-46-110)231-187(296)158(107(10)245)236-150(256)94-207-164(273)124(63-67-143(196)249)235-190(300)192(71-42-72-192)239-163(272)118(195)84-114-89-200-100-209-114/h25-30,33-34,43-48,55-62,88-89,100-108,118,120-142,157-159,203,240-248H,12-24,31-32,35-42,49-54,63-87,90-99,193-195H2,1-11H3,(H2,196,249)(H2,197,269)(H,200,209)(H,201,252)(H,204,250)(H,205,253)(H,206,274)(H,207,273)(H,208,275)(H,210,292)(H,211,270)(H,212,276)(H,213,251)(H,214,254)(H,215,255)(H,216,271)(H,217,280)(H,218,293)(H,219,282)(H,220,287)(H,221,295)(H,222,284)(H,223,286)(H,224,278)(H,225,289)(H,226,288)(H,227,279)(H,228,277)(H,229,283)(H,230,294)(H,231,296)(H,232,281)(H,233,285)(H,234,297)(H,235,300)(H,236,256)(H,237,290)(H,238,291)(H,239,272)(H,257,258)(H,259,260)(H,261,262)(H,263,264)(H,265,266)(H,267,268)(H,298,299)(H4,198,199,202)/t103-,104+,105-,106-,107+,108+,118-,120-,121-,122+,123-,124-,125-,126+,127?,128+,129-,130+,131-,132-,133-,134+,135-,136-,137-,138+,139+,140+,141-,142-,157-,158-,159-/m0/s1; Key:MEDXQFAHWBMVIM-YIUAJOCSSA-N

Survodutide (BI 456906) is an experimental peptide that works as a dual glucagon/GLP-1 receptor agonist. Unlike other dual GLP-1/glucagon dual agonists, it is a glucagon analog rather than an analog of oxyntomodulin. It is developed by Boehringer Ingelheim as a weight loss drug.

Survodutide is a twincretin having dual glucagon-like peptide-1 and glucagon receptor agonist activity, conceptually based on endogenous peptide oxyntomodulin. In a meta-analysis involving data from 3 randomized controlled trials having 1088 patients, 4- 11 months use of survodutide at doses 2.4-4.8 mg / week was associated with on an average 7-9% reduction in body weight from baseline. This translates to around 9-15kg of body weight reduction from baseline. Gastrointestinal side effects were the predominant side effects, were mild and dose dependent, as has been noted with other incretin based therapies.

In adults with obesity and at-risk MASLD, survodutide was statistically and clinically superior to placebo in reducing MRI-PDFF–assessed liver fat content (LFC) and body weight.
