= Streptomyces toxytricini =

Scientific classification
- Domain: Bacteria
- Kingdom: Bacillati
- Phylum: Actinomycetota
- Class: Actinomycetia
- Order: Streptomycetales
- Family: Streptomycetaceae
- Genus: Streptomyces
- Species: S. toxytricini

Binomial name
- Streptomyces toxytricini Preobrazhenskaya & Sveshnikova 1957

Species of bacterium

Streptomyces toxytricini is a Gram-positive bacterium belonging to the genus Streptomyces. It produces the pancreatic lipase inhibitor lipstatin, of which the antiobesity drug orlistat is a derivative.
