= Creatorrhea =

Abnormal excretion of muscle fibre in feces

Creatorrhea is the abnormal excretion of muscle fibre in feces. The term is made from the prefix creat- or creato- which comes from Greek kreas meaning "flesh". The suffix -rrhea (or -rrhoea) comes from Greek -rrhoia meaning "flow," hence discharge.

Digestion of food is achieved through a mixture of mechanical and chemical processes. Failure to produce or secrete chemicals known as digestive enzymes can lead to failure digesting or breaking down specific components of ingested food.

Where there is a failure to produce, release, or convert trypsinogen—an inactive enzyme precursor or zymogen—muscle fibres are not properly digested and are therefore released in the feces. Trypsinogen is produced in the pancreas and released into the alimentary canal where it is converted to the active enzyme trypsin. Inflammation of the pancreas, or pancreatitis can therefore precipitate this condition, as can cystic fibrosis which also affects the production of digestive enzymes.
