= Autolysis =

Autolysis may refer to:

- Autolysis (biology), the destruction (or lysis) of a cell by its own enzymes
- Autocatalysis, in chemistry, the production of a substance which catalyzes a chemical reaction it was made in, or catalyzes its own transformation into another compound
- Autolysis (alcohol fermentation), the complex chemical reactions that take place when wine or beer spends time in contact with the (dead) yeast after fermentation
- Breadmaking#Preparation, the rest period in which dough is left without yeast or starter to autolyse for improved gluten development
- Autolysing yeast, the natural process by which yeast breaks down its own proteins to simpler compounds, in the production of commercial extract
