= Petrelintide =

Clinical data
- Other names: ZP8396

Legal status
- Legal status: Investigational

Identifiers
- CAS Number: 2766385-23-1
- UNII: D78KBY7BRU

Chemical and physical data
- Formula: C_{185}H_{305}N_{49}O_{61}
- Molar mass: 4191.757 g·mol^{−1}
- SMILES: CC[C@H](C)[C@@H](C(=O)N[C@@H](CC(C)C)C(=O)N[C@@H](CO)C(=O)N[C@@H](CO)C(=O)N[C@H](C(=O)N[C@@H](CCC(=O)O)C(=O)N[C@H](C(=O)NCC(=O)N[C@@H](CO)C(=O)N[C@@H](CC(N)=O)C(=O)N[C@H](C(=O)N1C[C@H](O)C[C@H]1C(N)=O)[C@@H](C)O)C(C)C)[C@@H](C)O)N(C)C(=O)[C@H](C)NC(=O)CN(C)C(=O)[C@H](Cc1ccccc1)NC(=O)[C@H](CO)NC(=O)[C@H](CO)NC(=O)[C@H](CCCNC(=N)N)NC(=O)[C@H](CCC(N)=O)NC(=O)[C@H](CC(C)C)NC(=O)[C@H](Cc1ccccc1)NC(=O)[C@H](CCCC(=O)O)NC(=O)[C@H](C)NC(=O)[C@H](CC(C)C)NC(=O)[C@H](CCCNC(=N)N)NC(=O)[C@H](CCC(=O)O)NC(=O)[C@@H](NC(=O)[C@H](C)NC(=O)[C@@H]1CCCCNC(=O)C[C@H](NC(=O)[C@H](CCCNC(=N)N)NC(=O)CC[C@H](NC(=O)CCCCCCCCCCCCCCCCCCC(=O)O)C(=O)O)C(=O)NCC(=O)N[C@@H]([C@@H](C)O)C(=O)N[C@@H](C)C(=O)N[C@@H]([C@@H](C)O)C(=O)N1)[C@@H](C)O
- InChI: InChI=1S/C185H305N49O61/c1-22-96(10)149(178(290)220-120(77-94(6)7)165(277)223-128(90-238)171(283)225-129(91-239)172(284)230-147(104(18)243)177(289)214-116(66-70-142(260)261)162(274)227-143(95(8)9)173(285)200-83-136(251)207-125(87-235)168(280)218-122(81-132(187)247)167(279)231-148(105(19)244)181(293)234-85-108(245)80-130(234)150(188)262)233(21)179(291)100(14)201-138(253)86-232(20)180(292)124(79-107-53-41-38-42-54-107)221-169(281)126(88-236)224-170(282)127(89-237)222-159(271)113(59-50-74-198-185(193)194)210-160(272)114(63-67-131(186)246)211-164(276)119(76-93(4)5)216-166(278)121(78-106-51-39-37-40-52-106)217-157(269)111(56-47-62-140(256)257)208-151(263)97(11)203-163(275)118(75-92(2)3)215-158(270)112(58-49-73-197-184(191)192)209-161(273)115(65-69-141(258)259)213-176(288)146(103(17)242)228-152(264)98(12)202-155(267)110-55-45-46-71-195-135(250)82-123(154(266)199-84-137(252)226-144(101(15)240)174(286)204-99(13)153(265)229-145(102(16)241)175(287)212-110)219-156(268)109(57-48-72-196-183(189)190)205-134(249)68-64-117(182(294)295)206-133(248)60-43-35-33-31-29-27-25-23-24-26-28-30-32-34-36-44-61-139(254)255/h37-42,51-54,92-105,108-130,143-149,235-245H,22-36,43-50,55-91H2,1-21H3,(H2,186,246)(H2,187,247)(H2,188,262)(H,195,250)(H,199,266)(H,200,285)(H,201,253)(H,202,267)(H,203,275)(H,204,286)(H,205,249)(H,206,248)(H,207,251)(H,208,263)(H,209,273)(H,210,272)(H,211,276)(H,212,287)(H,213,288)(H,214,289)(H,215,270)(H,216,278)(H,217,269)(H,218,280)(H,219,268)(H,220,290)(H,221,281)(H,222,271)(H,223,277)(H,224,282)(H,225,283)(H,226,252)(H,227,274)(H,228,264)(H,229,265)(H,230,284)(H,231,279)(H,254,255)(H,256,257)(H,258,259)(H,260,261)(H,294,295)(H4,189,190,196)(H4,191,192,197)(H4,193,194,198)/t96-,97-,98-,99-,100-,101+,102+,103+,104+,105+,108+,109-,110-,111-,112-,113-,114-,115-,116-,117-,118-,119-,120-,121-,122-,123-,124-,125-,126-,127-,128-,129-,130-,143-,144-,145-,146-,147-,148-,149-/m0/s1; Key:TVOIUFVYEVVHCS-GUPZZLLYSA-N

Petrelintide (development name ZP8396) is an amylin analogue dosed once weekly, developed by Zealand Pharma for the treatment of type 2 diabetes and obesity. Preclinical data suggests it may be more effective in combination with semaglutide. In June 2024 the company announced results for a Phase 1b trial, which found 8.6 percent weight loss over 16 weeks.

In March 2025, Roche entered into an exclusive collaboration and licensing agreement with Zealand Pharma to co-develop and co-commercialise petrelintide as a potential foundational therapy for overweight and obese people. This development would focus on petrelintide, both as a standalone therapy and in a fixed-dose combination with CT-388 for overweight and obese people.
