= Keriorrhea =

Type of diarrhea

- Other names: Oily diarrhea, oily orange diarrhea, orange oily leakage

Keriorrhea (from Ancient Greek κηρός [kērós] 'wax' and ῥοία [rhoía] 'flow') is the production of greasy, orange-colored stools which results from the consumption of indigestible wax esters found in oilfish and escolar.

Most people experience the condition without bowel cramps or abdominal discomfort, suggesting that the condition is caused by the lubricant effect of the oil. A 2004 study by Ruello & Associates Pty Ltd found that neither cooking nor freezing reduced escolar's capacity to induce the condition. Frequency varies by outbreak, although at least 40–60% of people who consume sufficient quantities of escolar or oilfish develop symptoms, which usually comprise profuse oily diarrhea, severe rectal incontinence, and usually massive flatulence. Symptoms typically begin within 2 to 4 hours, with some cases as soon as 30 minutes or as late as 90 hours, and subside within 2 to 3 days, some cases lasting up to 7 days.

The fact that oilfish and escolar cause keriorrhea was the cause for Italy, Japan, and the Republic of Korea to ban them, for Australia, Canada, the United States, and most of the European Union to issue special guidelines towards trading and eating them, and the rest of the world to regard them as unsuitable for cooking. Outbreaks are usually caused by sellers mislabelling the two fishes as more expensive commercial fish such as seabass, codfish, butterfish, white tuna, or rudderfish.

The condition was named keriorrhea by Berman et al. in 1981, who named it for the Greek words for 'wax' and 'to flow through', and oily diarrhea, oily orange diarrhea, and orange oily leakage by writers for the media and the internet. More outbreaks make the latter than scientific literature and confusion by victims means the condition is frequently misdescribed as diarrhea, but outbreaks have been documented in multiple continents and multiple outbreaks have been documented in Australia. An outbreak caused by mislabeled oilfish affected more than 600 Hongkongers in late 2006, causing various political parties to organize demonstrations demanding government action.

== See also ==
- Steatorrhea
- Rectal discharge
