= Cagrilintide =

Chemical compound

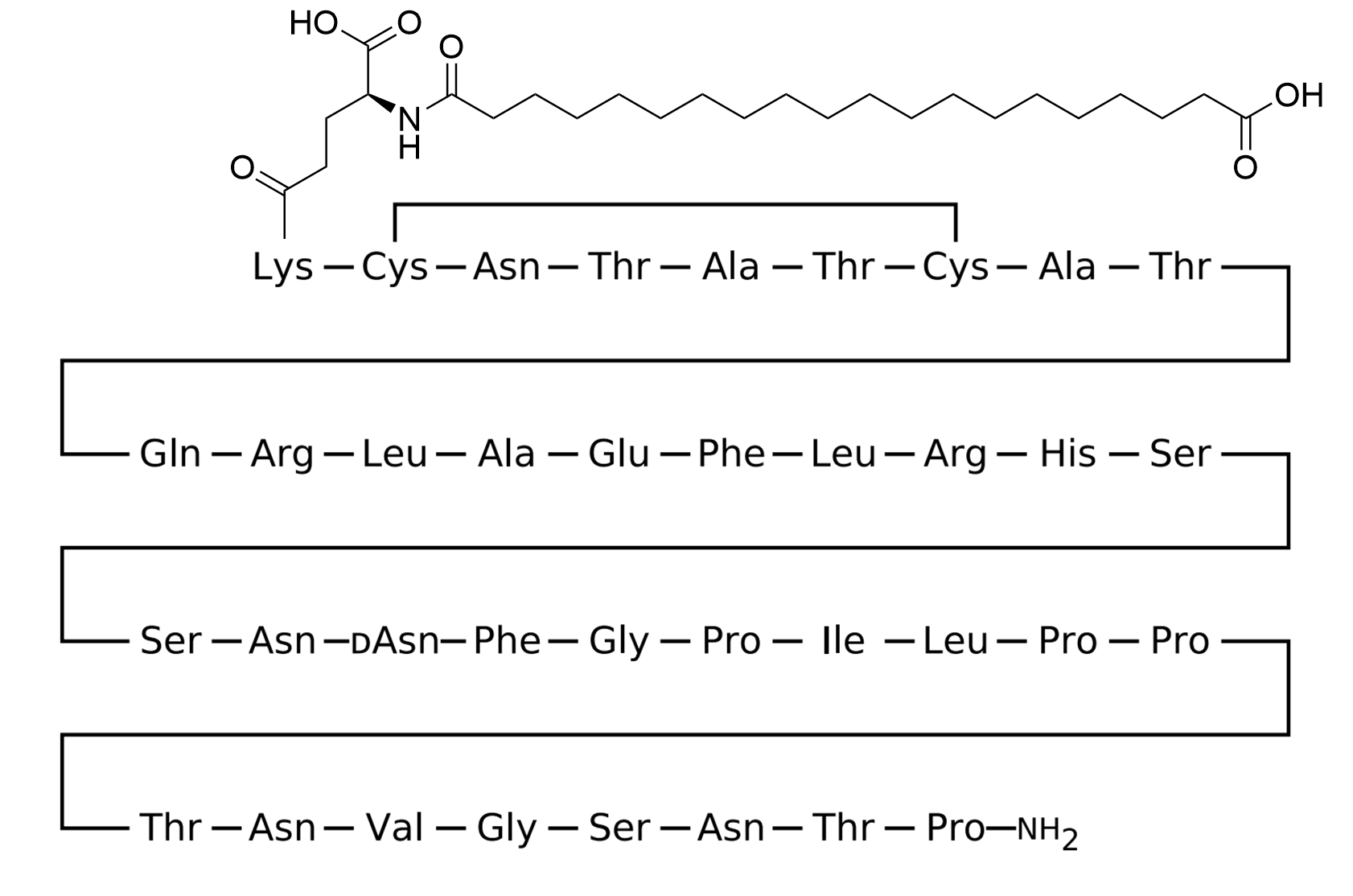

Clinical data
- Other names: GLXC-26801
- ATC code: None

Identifiers
- IUPAC name: 20-[[(1S)-4-[[(2S)-6-amino-1-[[(4R,7S,10S,13S,16S,19R)-4-[[(2S)-1-[[(2S,3R)-1-[[(2S)-5-amino-1-[[(2S)-1-[[(2S)-1-[[(2S)-1-[[(2S)-1-[[(2S)-1-[[(2S)-1-[[(2S)-1-[[(2S)-1-[[(2S)-1-[[(2S)-1-[[(2S)-4-amino-1-[[(2R)-4-amino-1-[[(2S)-1-[[2-[(2S)-2-[[(2S,3S)-1-[[(2S)-1-[(2S)-2-[(2S)-2-[[(2S,3R)-1-[[(2S)-4-amino-1-[[(2S)-1-[[2-[[(2S)-1-[[(2S)-4-amino-1-[[(2S,3R)-1-[(2S)-2-carbamoylpyrrolidin-1-yl]-3-hydroxy-1-oxobutan-2-yl]amino]-1,4-dioxobutan-2-yl]amino]-3-hydroxy-1-oxopropan-2-yl]amino]-2-oxoethyl]amino]-3-methyl-1-oxobutan-2-yl]amino]-1,4-dioxobutan-2-yl]amino]-3-hydroxy-1-oxobutan-2-yl]carbamoyl]pyrrolidine-1-carbonyl]pyrrolidin-1-yl]-4-methyl-1-oxopentan-2-yl]amino]-3-methyl-1-oxopentan-2-yl]carbamoyl]pyrrolidin-1-yl]-2-oxoethyl]amino]-1-oxo-3-phenylpropan-2-yl]amino]-1,4-dioxobutan-2-yl]amino]-1,4-dioxobutan-2-yl]amino]-3-hydroxy-1-oxopropan-2-yl]amino]-3-hydroxy-1-oxopropan-2-yl]amino]-3-(1H-imidazol-4-yl)-1-oxopropan-2-yl]amino]-5-carbamimidamido-1-oxopentan-2-yl]amino]-4-methyl-1-oxopentan-2-yl]amino]-1-oxo-3-phenylpropan-2-yl]amino]-4-carboxy-1-oxobutan-2-yl]amino]-1-oxopropan-2-yl]amino]-4-methyl-1-oxopentan-2-yl]amino]-5-carbamimidamido-1-oxopentan-2-yl]amino]-1,5-dioxopentan-2-yl]amino]-3-hydroxy-1-oxobutan-2-yl]amino]-1-oxopropan-2-yl]carbamoyl]-16-(2-amino-2-oxoethyl)-7,13-bis[(1R)-1-hydroxyethyl]-10-methyl-6,9,12,15,18-pentaoxo-1,2-dithia-5,8,11,14,17-pentazacycloicos-19-yl]amino]-1-oxohexan-2-yl]amino]-1-carboxy-4-oxobutyl]amino]-20-oxoicosanoic acid
- CAS Number: 1415456-99-3
- PubChem CID: 167312356
- DrugBank: DB18887
- ChemSpider: 129424923
- UNII: AO43BIF1U8

Chemical and physical data
- 3D model (JSmol): Interactive image
- SMILES: CC[C@H](C)[C@@H](C(=O)N[C@@H](CC(C)C)C(=O)N1CCC[C@H]1C(=O)N2CCC[C@H]2C(=O)N[C@@H]([C@@H](C)O)C(=O)N[C@@H](CC(=O)N)C(=O)N[C@@H](C(C)C)C(=O)NCC(=O)N[C@@H](CO)C(=O)N[C@@H](CC(=O)N)C(=O)N[C@@H]([C@@H](C)O)C(=O)N3CCC[C@H]3C(=O)N)NC(=O)[C@@H]4CCCN4C(=O)CNC(=O)[C@H](CC5=CC=CC=C5)NC(=O)[C@@H](CC(=O)N)NC(=O)[C@H](CC(=O)N)NC(=O)[C@H](CO)NC(=O)[C@H](CO)NC(=O)[C@H](CC6=CNC=N6)NC(=O)[C@H](CCCNC(=N)N)NC(=O)[C@H](CC(C)C)NC(=O)[C@H](CC7=CC=CC=C7)NC(=O)[C@H](CCC(=O)O)NC(=O)[C@H](C)NC(=O)[C@H](CC(C)C)NC(=O)[C@H](CCCNC(=N)N)NC(=O)[C@H](CCC(=O)N)NC(=O)[C@H]([C@@H](C)O)NC(=O)[C@H](C)NC(=O)[C@@H]8CSSC[C@@H](C(=O)N[C@H](C(=O)N[C@H](C(=O)N[C@H](C(=O)N[C@H](C(=O)N8)[C@@H](C)O)C)[C@@H](C)O)CC(=O)N)NC(=O)[C@H](CCCCN)NC(=O)CC[C@@H](C(=O)O)NC(=O)CCCCCCCCCCCCCCCCCCC(=O)O
- InChI: InChI=1S/C194H312N54O59S2/c1-19-100(10)151(184(298)233-128(78-98(6)7)189(303)248-75-49-60-137(248)190(304)247-74-48-59-136(247)182(296)243-155(107(17)255)187(301)232-127(86-143(201)262)173(287)238-150(99(8)9)183(297)210-88-146(265)218-129(90-249)176(290)230-126(85-142(200)261)175(289)244-156(108(18)256)191(305)246-73-46-57-134(246)157(202)271)239-181(295)135-58-47-72-245(135)147(266)89-211-161(275)120(79-109-50-36-34-37-51-109)225-171(285)123(82-139(197)258)228-172(286)124(83-140(198)259)229-177(291)130(91-250)235-178(292)131(92-251)234-170(284)122(81-111-87-207-95-212-111)227-164(278)114(56-45-71-209-194(205)206)221-168(282)119(77-97(4)5)224-169(283)121(80-110-52-38-35-39-53-110)226-166(280)116(65-68-149(269)270)219-158(272)101(11)213-167(281)118(76-96(2)3)223-163(277)113(55-44-70-208-193(203)204)220-165(279)115(63-66-138(196)257)222-186(300)153(105(15)253)240-159(273)102(12)214-179(293)132-93-308-309-94-133(180(294)231-125(84-141(199)260)174(288)242-152(104(14)252)185(299)215-103(13)160(274)241-154(106(16)254)188(302)237-132)236-162(276)112(54-42-43-69-195)216-145(264)67-64-117(192(306)307)217-144(263)61-40-32-30-28-26-24-22-20-21-23-25-27-29-31-33-41-62-148(267)268/h34-39,50-53,87,95-108,112-137,150-156,249-256H,19-33,40-49,54-86,88-94,195H2,1-18H3,(H2,196,257)(H2,197,258)(H2,198,259)(H2,199,260)(H2,200,261)(H2,201,262)(H2,202,271)(H,207,212)(H,210,297)(H,211,275)(H,213,281)(H,214,293)(H,215,299)(H,216,264)(H,217,263)(H,218,265)(H,219,272)(H,220,279)(H,221,282)(H,222,300)(H,223,277)(H,224,283)(H,225,285)(H,226,280)(H,227,278)(H,228,286)(H,229,291)(H,230,290)(H,231,294)(H,232,301)(H,233,298)(H,234,284)(H,235,292)(H,236,276)(H,237,302)(H,238,287)(H,239,295)(H,240,273)(H,241,274)(H,242,288)(H,243,296)(H,244,289)(H,267,268)(H,269,270)(H,306,307)(H4,203,204,208)(H4,205,206,209)/t100-,101-,102-,103-,104+,105+,106+,107+,108+,112-,113-,114-,115-,116-,117-,118-,119-,120-,121-,122-,123+,124-,125-,126-,127-,128-,129-,130-,131-,132-,133-,134-,135-,136-,137-,150-,151-,152-,153-,154-,155-,156-/m0/s1; Key:LDERDVMBIYGIOI-DDPFBLHVSA-N

Cagrilintide is a long-acting analogue of amylin. It is being tested to treat obesity and type 2 diabetes by itself and in combination with semaglutide as cagrilintide/semaglutide ("CagriSema").

== Research ==
A systematic review and metanalysis of cagrisema, published in 2024, found that cagrisema may provide weight loss benefits.

Novo Nordisk announced late at the 2025 European Association for the Study of Diabetes (EASD) annual meeting that in the REDEFINE 1 study, cagrilintide provided clinically significant weight loss, with a mean reduction in body weight of 11.8% compared to 2.3% with placebo after 68 weeks, considering adherence of all participants to treatment. In addition, approximately 1 in 3 participants (31.6%) who received cagrilintide achieved a weight loss ≥15%, compared to approximately 1 in 20 participants (4.7%) who received placebo.
