= Wax ester =

Ester of a fatty acid and a fatty alcohol

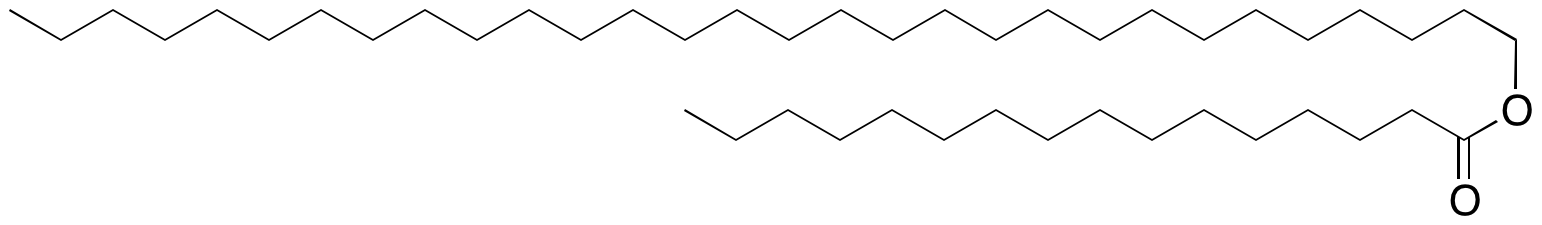
Triacontanyl palmitate, a typical wax ester, is derived from triacontanyl alcohol and palmitic acid.

A wax ester (WE; also known as a ceride) is an ester of a fatty acid and a fatty alcohol. Wax esters are the main components of two commercially important waxes: carnauba wax and beeswax.

Wax esters are formed by combining one fatty acid with one fatty alcohol:

RCO_{2}H + R'OH ⇌ RCO_{2}R' + H_{2}O

Some wax esters are saturated, and others contain unsaturated centers. Saturated wax esters have higher melting points and are more likely to be solid at room temperature. Unsaturated wax esters have a lower melting point and are more likely to be liquid at room temperature. Both fatty acids and fatty alcohols may be made of different carbon chain length. There are many different possible combinations of fatty acids and fatty alcohols and each combination will have a unique set of properties in terms of steric orientation and phase transition.

The chain lengths of fatty acids and fatty alcohols in naturally occurring wax esters vary. The fatty acids in wax esters derived from plants typically range from C12-C24, and the alcohols in plant waxes tend to be very long, typically C24-C34. The fatty acids and fatty alcohols of wax esters from different marine animals show major differences. Wax esters of sperm whales contain C12 fatty acids and C14 fatty acid and alcohols. Monounsaturated C18 is the dominant fatty acid of most fish wax esters, with the exception of roe wax esters, which have sizeable amounts of polyunsaturated fatty acids such as 20:5n-3, 22:5n-3 and 22:6n-3. The fatty acids of wax esters of certain zooplankton largely reflects the fatty acids of phytoplankton, and contain high amounts of C14 and C16, as well as 20:5n-3, 22:5n-3 and 22:6n-3 and monounsaturated C20 and C22 are the principal fatty alcohols.

== Natural sources ==
Beeswax is 70–80% wax esters. These esters are derived from C12-C20 fatty acids. The remaining content of beeswax are wax acids (>C20) and paraffins. In 1976, an estimated 10,000–17,000 tons were harvested. The primary use was in candles. The esters in carnauba wax consist of approximately 20% cinnamic acid derivatives, which may be related to the hardness of this wax.

=== Other, minor wax esters ===
Wax esters are commonly found in shellfish and as a part of the cuticle of arthropods. In leaves, they prevent loss of water.

Nuts from jojoba contain about 52% oil, 97% of which are wax esters. These wax esters, which are monounsaturated, are very similar to sperm oil.

Marine organisms like dinoflagellates, pelagic invertebrates, and fishes store low-density wax esters in their swim bladders or other tissues to provide buoyancy.

Wax esters per se are a normal part of the diet of humans as a lipid component of certain foods, including unrefined whole grain cereals, seeds, and nuts. Wax esters are also consumed in considerable amounts by certain populations that regularly eat fish roe or certain fish species. That said, wax esters are not typically consumed in appreciable quantities in diets containing many processed foods.

== Metabolism ==
Lipases and carboxylesterases that hydrolyze triglycerides have demonstrated enzymatic activity towards wax esters. Kinetic data show that EPA and DHA provided as wax esters reaches a maximal concentration at approximately 20 h post-consumption, and may indicate delayed absorption of the fatty acids.

The human sebum is a distinctive lipid mixture. By weight, it is about 57% triglycerides/diglycerides/free fatty acids, 26% wax esters, 12% squalene, and 2% cholesterol. Wax esters and squalene are characteristic of sebum and are not present in substantial amounts in other tissues. The reasons are unknown. The biological function of squalene is unknown. The biological function of the wax esters is that it is, for some reason, essential for the survival of sebaceous glands. In knockout mice that lack wax esters, their sebaceous glands atrophy, and they suffer hair loss

== Bioavailability ==
There has been a common understanding that wax esters are poorly absorbed by humans, partly due to outbreaks of the purgative effect named keriorrhea, associated with consumption of oilfish (Ruvettus pretiosus) and escolar (Lepdocybium flavobrunneum). Fillets from these fish species contain up to 20% fat, where 90% of the fat comes as wax esters, resulting in a typical intake of more than 30 000 mg wax esters from one single meal. Orange roughy (Hoplostethus atlanticus) is an attractive food fish with 5.5% fat, where 90% of the fat comes as wax esters. Consumption of this fish gives no unpleasant adverse effects, most likely due to the relatively low fat content that provides approximately 10 000 mg wax ester per 200 grams serving of fish.

In 2015 a randomized, two-period crossover human study, showed that EPA and DHA from oil extracted from the small crustacean Calanus finmarchicus was highly bioavailable and the study concluded that oil from C. finmarchicus could serve as a relevant source of the healthy omega-3 fatty acids EPA, DHA and SDA. 86% of the oil from C. finmarchicus comes as wax esters.

Studies on mice have shown that, despite consuming diets containing similar amounts of EPA and DHA, blood levels of both EPA and DHA were significantly higher in mice fed a diet supplemented with oil from C. finmarchicus compared to those fed an EPA+DHA ethyl ester enriched diet. Furthermore, oil from C. finmarchicus has been observed to have beneficial effects on obesity-related abnormalities in rodent models of diet-induced obesity at EPA and DHA fatty acid concentrations considerably lower than the concentrations used in similar earlier studies using other sources of EPA and DHA. Taken together, based on the available in vitro data, animal data, and the findings of the Cook et al. study demonstrating that circulating concentrations of EPA and DHA remained elevated up to 72 h after a single serving of 4 g oil from C. finmarchicus the hydrolyzed products of wax ester digestion are most likely slowly absorbed in vivo.

== Role as a nutrient ==
Marine wax esters have become a focus of attention due to documented positive effects on widespread medical conditions related to certain diets. Harvesting on a lower trophic level on short-lived organisms would be more sustainable and the products would be less prone to environmental toxins and pollutants.

== See also ==
- Keriorrhea
