= Colipase =

Mammalian protein found in humans

CLPS
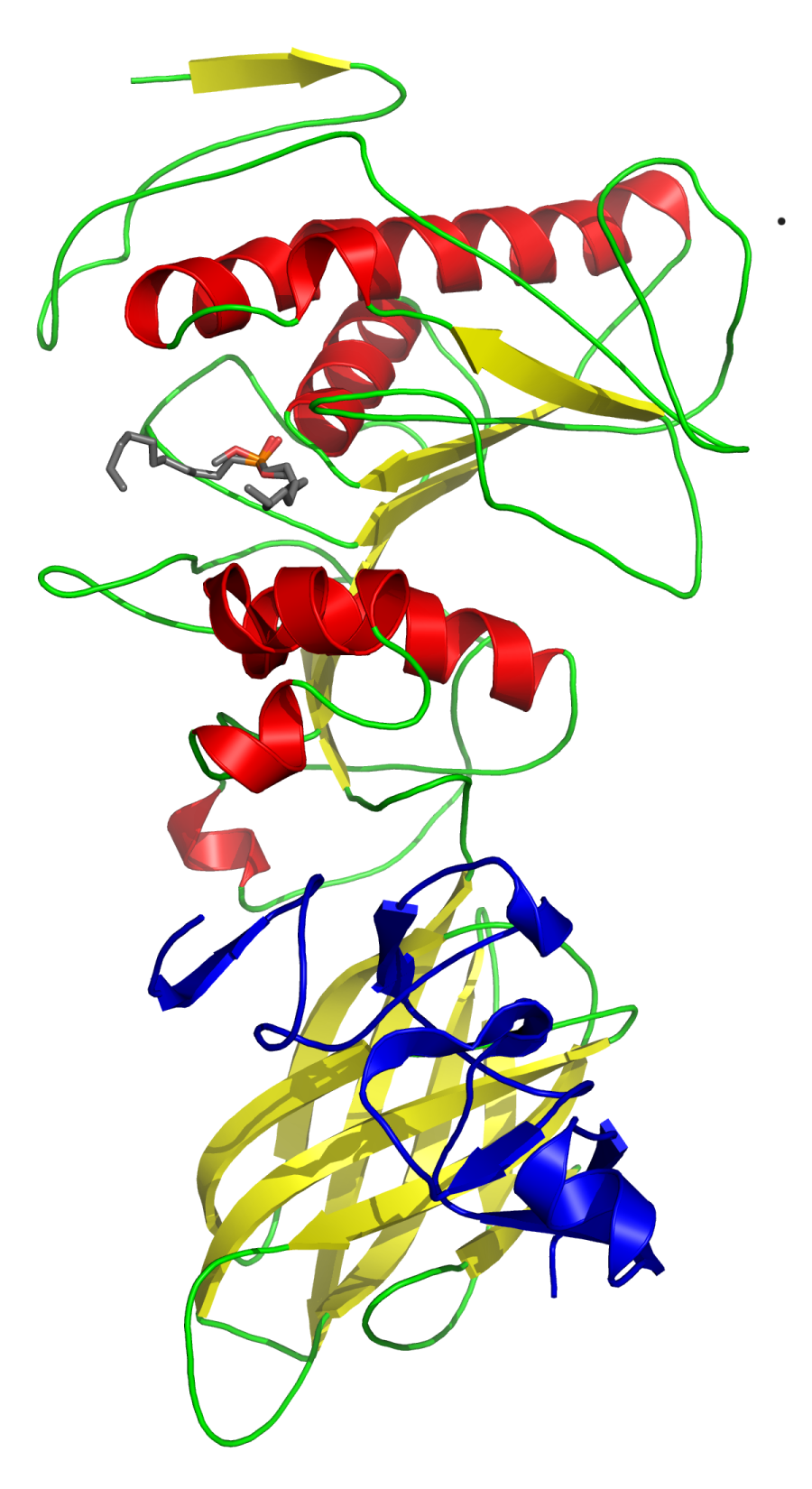

Identifiers
- Aliases: CLPS, entrez:1208, colipase
- External IDs: OMIM: 120105; MGI: 88421; GeneCards: CLPS

Gene location (Human)
Chr.	Chromosome 6 (human)
Band	6p21.31	Start	35,794,982 bp
Band	6p21.31	End	35,797,344 bp

Gene location (Mouse)
Chr.	Chromosome 17 (mouse)
Band	17|17 A3.3	Start	28,777,123 bp
Band	17|17 A3.3	End	28,779,740 bp
RNA expression pattern
Bgee	Human / Mouse (ortholog); Top expressed in: body of pancreas; islet of Langerhans; testicle; pancreatic epithelial cell; beta cell; right coronary artery; ectocervix; right uterine tube; Descending thoracic aorta; right lobe of liver / Top expressed in: stomach; islet of Langerhans; jejunum; duodenum; colon; ileum; esophagus; morula; quadriceps femoris muscle; yolk sac; More reference expression data
BioGPS	More reference expression data
Gene ontology
Molecular function	enzyme activator activity
Cellular component	extracellular region
Biological process	lipid catabolic process; digestion; positive regulation of catalytic activity; lipid metabolism; response to food; response to bacterium; retinoid metabolic process; lipid digestion
Sources:Amigo / QuickGO
Orthologs
Databases	NCBI: entry; OMA: entry
Species	Human	Mouse
Entrez	1208	109791
Ensembl	ENSG00000137392	ENSMUSG00000024225
UniProt	P04118	Q9CQC2
RefSeq (mRNA)	NM_001832; NM_001252597; NM_001252598	NM_025469; NM_001317065
RefSeq (protein)	NP_001239526; NP_001239527; NP_001823	NP_001303994; NP_079745
Location (UCSC)	Chr 6: 35.79 – 35.8 Mb	Chr 17: 28.78 – 28.78 Mb
PubMed search
- Wikidata
View/Edit Human	View/Edit Mouse

Colipase, abbreviated CLPS, is a protein co-enzyme that counteracts the inhibitory effect of intestinal bile acid on the enzymatic activity of pancreatic lipase. It is secreted by the acinar cells of the pancreas in an inactive form, procolipase, which is activated by trypsin in the intestinal lumen.

Intestinal bile acids (which aid lipid digestion by facilitating micelle formation) adhere to the surface of emulsified fat droplets, displacing lipase (which is only active at the water-fat interface) from the droplet surface. Colipase acts as a bridging molecule, binding to both lipase and bile acids, thus anchoring lipase onto the droplet surface, preventing its displacement.

In humans, the colipase precursor protein is encoded by the CLPS gene. This precursor protein also contains the satiety signaling hormone enterostatin.

== Protein domain ==
Colipase is also a family of evolutionarily related proteins.

Colipase is a small protein cofactor needed by pancreatic lipase for efficient dietary lipid hydrolysis. Efficient absorption of dietary fats is dependent on the action of pancreatic triglyceride lipase. Colipase binds to the C-terminal, non-catalytic domain of lipase, thereby stabilising an active conformation and considerably increasing the hydrophobicity of its binding site. Structural studies of the complex and of colipase alone have revealed the functionality of its architecture.

Colipase is a small protein (12K) with five conserved disulfide bonds. Structural analogies have been recognised between a developmental protein (Dickkopf), the pancreatic lipase C-terminal domain, the N-terminal domains of lipoxygenases and the C-terminal domain of alpha-toxin. These non-catalytic domains in the latter enzymes are important for interaction with membrane. It has not been established if these domains are also involved in eventual protein cofactor binding as is the case for pancreatic lipase.

Colipase N-terminal domain
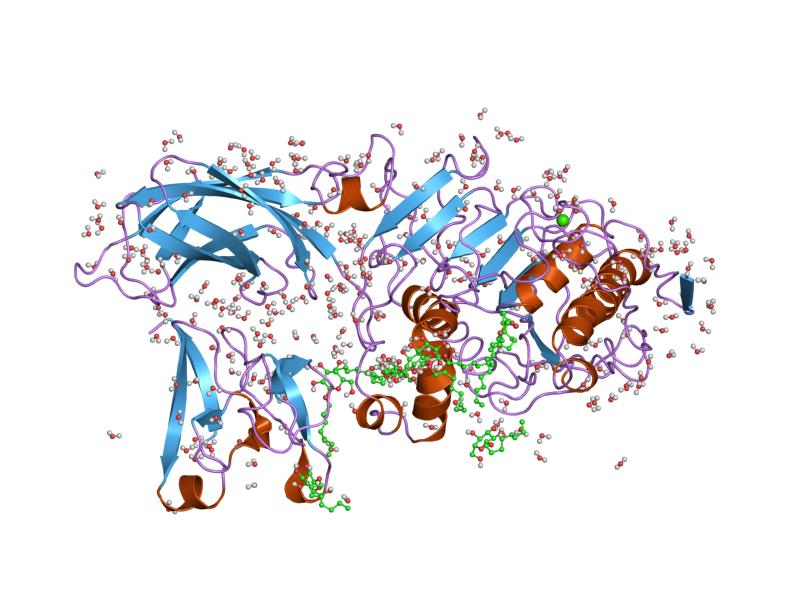
- Structure of the pancreatic lipase-colipase complex inhibited by a C11 alkyl phosphonate.

Identifiers
- Symbol: Colipase
- Pfam: PF01114
- InterPro: IPR001981
- PROSITE: PDOC00111
- SCOP2: 1lpb / SCOPe / SUPFAM
- CDD: cd00039
Available protein structures:
- PDB: 1eth, 1lpa, 1lpb, 1n8s, 1pcn, 1pco IPR001981 PF01114 (ECOD; PDBsum)
- AlphaFold: IPR001981; PF01114

Colipase C-terminal domain
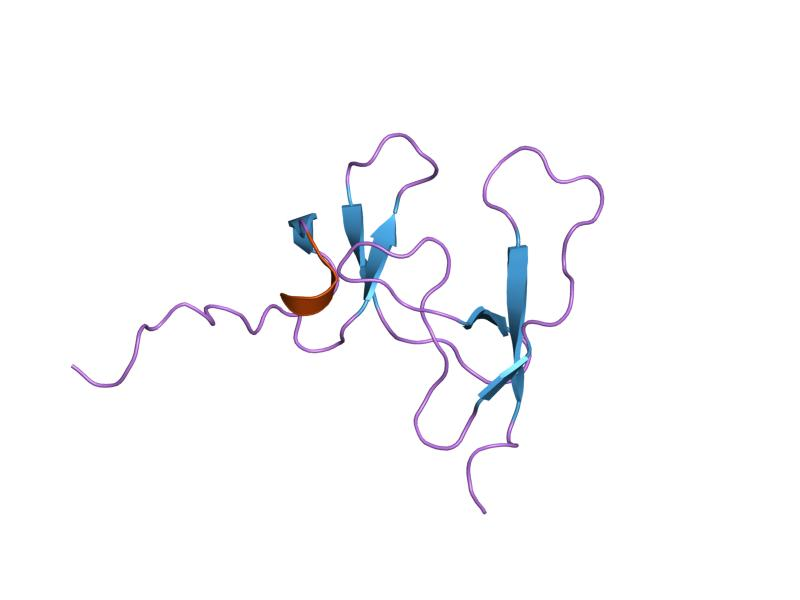
- solution structure of porcine pancreatic procolipase as determined from 1h homonuclear two-and three-dimensional nmr

Identifiers
- Symbol: Colipase_C
- Pfam: PF02740
- InterPro: IPR017914
- PROSITE: PDOC00111
- SCOP2: 1lpb / SCOPe / SUPFAM
- CDD: cd00039
Available protein structures:
- PDB: IPR017914 PF02740 (ECOD; PDBsum)
- AlphaFold: IPR017914; PF02740

== See also ==
- Enterostatin
