= Steatorrhea =

Presence of excess fat in feces

- Specialty: Gastroenterology, general surgery

Steatorrhea (or steatorrhoea) is the presence of excess fat in feces. Stools may be bulky and difficult to flush, have a pale and oily appearance, and can be especially foul-smelling. An oily anal leakage or some level of fecal incontinence may occur. There is increased fat excretion, which can be measured by determining the fecal fat level. It may occur in conjunction with other malabsorption signs such as creatorrhea.

== Causes ==
Impaired digestion or absorption can result in fatty stools. Possible causes include exocrine pancreatic insufficiency, with poor digestion from lack of lipases, loss of bile salts, which reduces micelle formation, and small intestinal disease-producing malabsorption. Various other causes include certain medicines that block fat absorption or indigestible or excess oil/fat in diet.

The absence of bile secretion can cause the feces to turn gray or pale. Bile is responsible for the brownish color of feces. In addition to this, bile also plays a role in fat absorption, where dietary lipids are combined so that pancreatic lipases can hydrolyze them before going towards the small intestine. Without bile acids, this pathway would have a hard time occurring, which would lead to fat malabsorption and make steatorrhea more probable to occur. Other features of fat malabsorption may also occur such as reduced bone density, difficulty with vision under low light levels, bleeding, bruising, and slow blood clotting times.

=== Associated diseases ===
- Conditions affecting the pancreas. Exocrine pancreatic insufficiency can be caused by chronic pancreatitis, cystic fibrosis and pancreatic cancer (if it obstructs biliary outflow).
- Conditions affecting bile salts. Obstruction of the bile ducts by gallstones (choledocholithiasis), primary sclerosing cholangitis, liver damage (hepatitis, intrahepatic cholestasis), hypolipidemic drugs, or changes following gallbladder removal (cholecystectomy).
- Conditions producing intestinal malabsorption. These include celiac disease, bacterial overgrowth, tropical sprue, giardiasis (a protozoan parasite infection), Zollinger-Ellison syndrome, short bowel syndrome, inflammatory bowel disease and abetalipoproteinemia.
- Other causes: Drugs that can produce steatorrhea include orlistat, a slimming pill, or as adverse effect of octreotide or lanreotide, used to treat acromegaly or other neuroendocrine tumors. It can be found in Graves' disease / hyperthyroidism.

=== Medications ===
Orlistat (also known by trade names Xenical and Alli) is a diet pill that works by blocking the enzymes that digest fat. As a result, some fat cannot be absorbed from the gut and is excreted in the feces instead of being metabolically digested and absorbed, sometimes causing oily anal leakage. Vytorin (ezetimibe/simvastatin) tablets can cause steatorrhea in some people.

=== Excess whole nuts in diet ===
Some studies have shown that stool lipids are increased when whole nuts are eaten, compared to nut butters, oils or flour and that lipids from whole nuts are significantly less well absorbed.

=== Natural fats ===
Consuming jojoba oil has been documented to cause steatorrhea and anal leakage because it is indigestible.

Consuming escolar and oilfish (sometimes mislabelled as butterfish) will often cause steatorrhea, also referred to as gempylotoxism or gempylid fish poisoning or keriorrhea.

=== Artificial fats ===
The fat substitute Olestra, used to reduce digestible fat in some foods, was reported to cause anal leakage in some consumers during the test-marketing phase. As a result, the product was reformulated before general release to a hydrogenated form that is not liquid at physiologic temperature. The U.S. Food and Drug Administration warning indicated excessive consumption of Olestra could result in "loose stools"; however, this warning has not been required since 2003.

== Diagnosis ==
Steatorrhea should be suspected when the stools are bulky, floating and foul-smelling. Specific tests are needed to confirm that these properties are in fact due to excessive levels of fat. Fats in feces can be measured over a defined time (often five days). Other tests include the (13)C-mixed triglycerides test and fecal elastase, to detect possible fat maldigestion due to exocrine pancreatic insufficiency, or various specific tests to detect other causes of malabsorption such as celiac disease.

== Treatment ==
Treatments are mainly correction of the underlying cause, as well as digestive enzyme supplements.

== See also ==
- Rectal discharge
- Keriorrhea
- Fecal leakage
- Steatocrit
