= Orlistat =

Drug designed to treat obesity

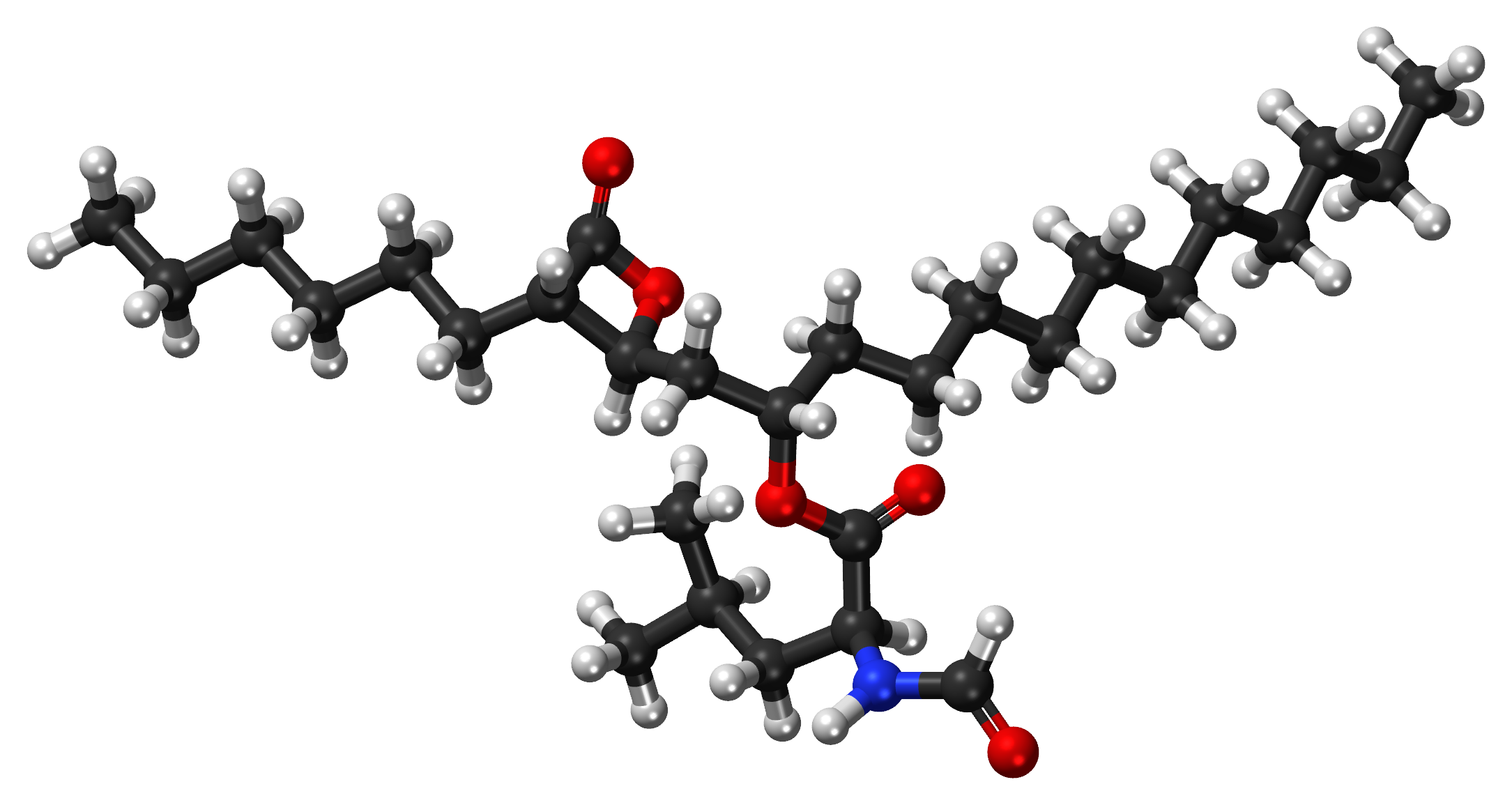

Clinical data
- Trade names: Xenical, Alli
- Other names: tetrahydrolipstatin
- AHFS/Drugs.com: Monograph
- MedlinePlus: a601244
- License data: EU EMA: by INN; US DailyMed: Orlistat; US FDA: Orlistat
- Pregnancy category: AU: B1
- Routes of administration: By mouth
- ATC code: A08AB01 (WHO)

Legal status
- Legal status: AU: S3 (Pharmacist only); CA: ℞-only; UK: P (Pharmacy medicines) / POM; US: OTC / Rx-only; EU: OTC / Rx-only

Pharmacokinetic data
- Bioavailability: Negligible
- Protein binding: >99%
- Metabolism: In the GI tract
- Elimination half-life: 1 to 2 hours
- Excretion: Fecal

Identifiers
- IUPAC name: (S)-((S)-1-((2S,3S)-3-Hexyl-4-oxooxetan-2-yl)tridecan-2-yl) 2-formamido-4-methylpentanoate
- CAS Number: 96829-58-2
- PubChem CID: 3034010
- IUPHAR/BPS: 5277
- DrugBank: DB01083
- ChemSpider: 2298564
- UNII: 95M8R751W8
- KEGG: D04028
- ChEBI: CHEBI:94686
- ChEMBL: ChEMBL175247
- CompTox Dashboard (EPA): DTXSID8023395
- ECHA InfoCard: 100.167.400

Chemical and physical data
- Formula: C_{29}H_{53}NO_{5}
- Molar mass: 495.745 g·mol^{−1}
- 3D model (JSmol): Interactive image
- SMILES: O=C(O[C@H](C[C@@H]1OC(=O)[C@H]1CCCCCC)CCCCCCCCCCC)[C@@H](NC=O)CC(C)C
- InChI: InChI=1S/C29H53NO5/c1-5-7-9-11-12-13-14-15-16-18-24(34-29(33)26(30-22-31)20-23(3)4)21-27-25(28(32)35-27)19-17-10-8-6-2/h22-27H,5-21H2,1-4H3,(H,30,31)/t24-,25-,26-,27-/m0/s1; Key:AHLBNYSZXLDEJQ-FWEHEUNISA-N

Orlistat, sold under the brand name Xenical among others, is a medication used to treat obesity. Its primary function is preventing the absorption of fats from the human diet by acting as a lipase inhibitor, thereby reducing caloric intake. It is intended for use in conjunction with a healthcare provider-supervised reduced-calorie diet.

Orlistat is the saturated derivative of lipstatin, a potent natural inhibitor of pancreatic lipases isolated from the bacterium Streptomyces toxytricini. However, due to its relative simplicity and stability, orlistat was chosen over lipstatin for development as an anti-obesity drug.

The effectiveness of orlistat in promoting weight loss is definite but modest. Pooled data from clinical trials suggest that people given orlistat in addition to lifestyle modifications, such as diet and exercise, lose about 2–3 kilograms (4–7 lb) more than those not taking the drug over the course of a year. Orlistat also modestly reduces blood pressure and appears to prevent the onset of type 2 diabetes, whether from the weight loss itself or other effects. It reduces the incidence of diabetes type 2 in people who are obese around the same amount that lifestyle changes do.

Benefits aside, however, orlistat is noted for its gastrointestinal side effects (sometimes referred to as treatment effects), which can include steatorrhea (oily, loose stools). They decrease with time, however, and are the most frequently reported adverse effects of the drug. In Australia, the United States and the European Union, orlistat is available for sale without a prescription. Over-the-counter approval was controversial in the United States, with consumer advocacy group Public Citizen repeatedly opposing it on safety and efficacy grounds. Generic formulations of orlistat are available in some countries. In Australia it has been listed as an S3 medication, available from a pharmacist without a prescription, since 2000.

== Medical uses ==
Orlistat is used for the treatment of obesity. The amount of weight loss achieved with orlistat varies. In one-year clinical trials, between 35.5% and 54.8% of subjects achieved a 5% or greater decrease in body mass, although not all of this mass was necessarily fat. Between 16.4% and 24.8% achieved at least a 10% decrease in body fat. After orlistat was stopped, a significant number of subjects regained weight—up to 35% of the weight they had lost. It reduces the incidence of diabetes type 2 in people who are obese around the same amount that lifestyle changes do. Long-term use of orlistat also leads to a very modest reduction in blood pressure (mean reductions of 2.5 and 1.9 mmHg in systolic and diastolic blood pressure respectively).

== Contraindications ==
Orlistat is contraindicated in:

- Malabsorption
- Hypersensitivity to orlistat
- Reduced gallbladder function (e.g. after cholecystectomy)
- Pregnancy and breastfeeding
- Anorexia and Bulimia
- Use caution with: obstructed bile duct, impaired liver function, and pancreatic disease

== Side effects ==
The primary side effects of the drug are gastrointestinal-related, and include steatorrhea (oily, loose stools with excessive flatus due to unabsorbed fats reaching the large intestine), fecal incontinence and frequent or urgent bowel movements. To minimize these effects, foods with high fat content should be avoided; the manufacturer advises consumers to follow a low-fat, reduced-calorie diet. Oily stools and flatulence can be controlled by reducing the dietary fat content to somewhere in the region of 15 grams per meal. The manual for Alli makes it clear that orlistat treatment involves aversion therapy, encouraging the user to associate eating fat with unpleasant treatment effects.

Side effects are most severe when beginning therapy and may decrease in frequency with time; it has also been suggested that the decrease in side effects over time may be associated with long-term compliance with a low-fat diet.

On 26 May 2010, the U.S. Food and Drug Administration (FDA) approved a revised label for Xenical to include new safety information about cases of severe liver injury that have been reported rarely with the use of this medication.

An analysis of over 900 orlistat users in Ontario showed that their rate of acute kidney injury was more than triple that of non-users.

A study from 2013 looked at 94,695 participants receiving orlistat in the UK between 1999 and 2011. The study showed no evidence of an increased risk of liver injury during treatment. They concluded:

The incidence of acute liver injury was higher in the periods both immediately before and immediately after the start of orlistat treatment. This suggests that the observed increased risks of liver injury linked to the start of treatment may reflect changes in health status associated with the decision to begin treatment rather than any causal effect of the drug.

=== Long-term ===
Despite a higher incidence of breast cancer amongst those taking orlistat in early, pooled clinical trial data—the analysis of which delayed FDA review of orlistat—a two-year study published in 1999 found similar rates between orlistat and placebo (0.54% versus 0.51%), and evidence that tumors predated treatment in 3 of the 4 participants who had them. There is evidence from an in vitro study to suggest that the introduction of specific varied preparations containing orlistat, namely the concurrent administration of orlistat and the monoclonal antibody trastuzumab, can induce cell death in breast cancer cells and block their growth.

Fecal fat excretion promotes colon carcinogenesis. In 2006 the results of 30-day study were published indicating that orlistat at a dosage of 200 mg/kg chow administered to rats consuming a high-fat chow and receiving two 25 mg/kg doses of the potent carcinogen 1,2-dimethylhydrazine produced significantly higher numbers of aberrant crypt foci (ACF) colon lesions than did the carcinogen plus high-fat chow without orlistat. ACF lesions are believed to be one of the earliest precursors of colon cancer.

=== Precautions ===
Absorption of fat-soluble vitamins and other fat-soluble nutrients is inhibited by the use of orlistat.

=== Interactions ===
Orlistat may reduce plasma levels of ciclosporin (also known as "cyclosporin" or "cyclosporine", trade names Sandimmune, Gengraf, Neoral, etc.), an immunosuppressive drug frequently used to prevent transplant rejection; the two drugs should therefore not be administered concomitantly. Orlistat can also impair absorption of the antiarrhythmic amiodarone. The Medicines and Healthcare products Regulatory Agency (MHRA) has suggested the possibility that orlistat could reduce the absorption of antiretroviral HIV medications.

The opioid receptor agonist loperamide assists with stool consistency in individuals taking orlistat. Continence problems caused by how orlistat blocks the absorption of fat were found to be improved with loperamide intervention.

== Mechanism of action ==
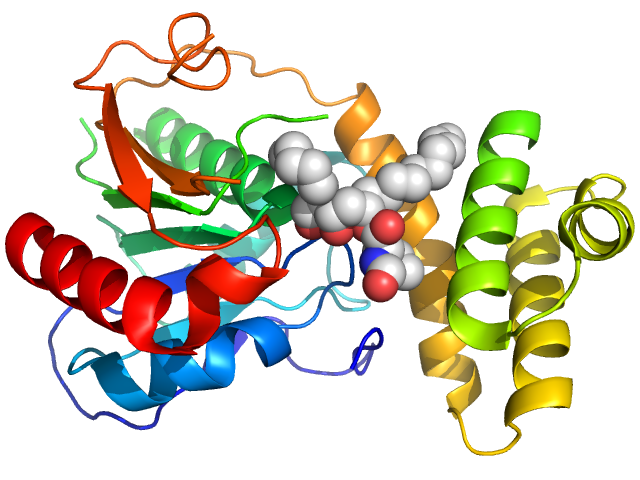
Crystallographic structure of human fatty acid synthase thioesterase (rainbow color, N-terminus = blue, C-terminus = red) inhibited by orlistat (space-filling model; carbon = grey, oxygen = red, nitrogen = blue)

Orlistat works by inhibiting gastric and pancreatic lipases, the enzymes that break down triglycerides in the intestine. When lipase activity is blocked, triglycerides from the diet are not hydrolyzed into absorbable free fatty acids, and instead are excreted unchanged. Only trace amounts of orlistat are absorbed systemically; the primary effect is local lipase inhibition within the GI tract after an oral dose. The primary route of elimination is through the feces.

Orlistat was also found to inhibit the thioesterase domain of fatty acid synthase (FAS), an enzyme involved in the proliferation of cancer cells but not normal cells. However, potential side effects of orlistat, such as inhibition of other cellular off-targets or poor bioavailability, might hamper its application as an effective antitumor agent. One profiling study undertook a chemical proteomics approach to look for new cellular targets of orlistat, including its off-targets. Orlistat also shows potential activity against the Trypanosoma brucei parasite.

Orlistat prevents approximately 30% of dietary fat from being absorbed.

== Legal status ==
Orlistat is available both with and without a prescription.

=== Australia and New Zealand ===
In Australia and New Zealand, orlistat is available as a "Pharmacist Only Medicine". In 2007, the Committee decided to keep orlistat as a Schedule 3 drug, but withdrew its authorization of direct-to-consumer Xenical advertising, stating this "increased pressure on pharmacists to provide orlistat to consumers...this in turn had the potential to result in inappropriate patterns of use".

=== United States ===
Orlistat was initially approved by the U.S. Food and Drug Administration in April 1999 as a prescription-only medication. On 23 January 2006, an FDA advisory panel voted 11 to 3 to recommend the approval of an OTC formulation of orlistat, to be sold under the brand name Alli by GlaxoSmithKline. Approval was granted on 7 February 2007, and Alli became the first weight loss drug officially sanctioned by the U.S. government for over-the-counter use. Consumer advocacy organization Public Citizen opposed over-the-counter approval for orlistat.

Alli became available in the U.S. in June 2007. It is sold as 60 mg capsules—half the dosage of prescription orlistat.

=== European Union and Switzerland ===
On 21 January 2009, the European Medicines Agency granted approval for the sale of orlistat without a prescription.

At least since September 2017, tablets with 60 mg orlistat can be freely sold in Swiss drugstores. Formulations with 120 mg per tablet require a prescription, but can be sold without one in pharmacies under an exemption rule, which is based on a list of easily diagnosable diseases.

=== Generic formulations ===
U.S. patent protection for Xenical, originally to end on 18 June 2004, was extended by five years (until 2009) by the U.S. Patent and Trademark Office. The extension was granted on 20 July 2002, and expired on 18 June 2009.

Generic orlistat is available in Iran under the brand Venustat manufactured by Aburaihan Pharmaceutical co., in India, under the brands Orlean (Eris), Vyfat, Olistat, Obelit, Orlica and Reeshape. In Russia, orlistat is available under the brand names Xenical (Hoffmann–La Roche), Orsoten/Orsoten Slim (KRKA d. d.) and Xenalten (OBL-Pharm). In Austria, orlistat is available under the brand name Slimox. In Malaysia, orlistat is available under the brand name Cuvarlix and is marketed by Pharmaniaga. In the Philippines orlistat is available under the brand name RedoXfat Plus manufactured by ATC Healthcare

== Society and culture ==
=== Cost ===
At times, such as in spring 2012, orlistat has come into short supply, with consequent price increases because of nonavailability of one of the drug's components.

=== Counterfeit products ===
In January 2010, the U.S. Food and Drug Administration issued an alert stating that some counterfeit versions of Alli sold over the Internet contain no orlistat, and instead contain the weight-loss drug sibutramine. The concentration of sibutramine in these counterfeit products is at least twice the amount recommended for weight loss.
