= Pancreatic lipase =

Digestive enzyme found in humans

PNLIP

Identifiers
- Aliases: PNLIP, PNLIPD, PTL, PL, pancreatic lipase
- External IDs: OMIM: 246600; MGI: 97722; GeneCards: PNLIP
Available structures
PDB	Ortholog search: PDBe RCSB
PDB	List of PDB id codes 1LPA, 1LPB, 1N8S
Enzyme activity
EC #	BRENDA	ExPASy	KEGG	MetaCyc
3.1.1.3	↗	↗	↗	↗

Gene location (Human)
Chr.	Chromosome 10 (human)
Band	10q25.3	Start	116,545,931 bp
Band	10q25.3	End	116,567,855 bp

Gene location (Mouse)
Chr.	Chromosome 19 (mouse)
Band	19 D2|19 54.46 cM	Start	58,640,930 bp
Band	19 D2|19 54.46 cM	End	58,670,220 bp
RNA expression pattern
Bgee	Human / Mouse (ortholog); Top expressed in: body of pancreas; islet of Langerhans; testicle; beta cell; right coronary artery; ectocervix; right lobe of liver; Descending thoracic aorta; canal of the cervix; right uterine tube / Top expressed in: pyloric antrum; islet of Langerhans; lumbar spinal ganglion; duodenum; gastrula; esophagus; spleen; right ventricle; sternocleidomastoid muscle; superior frontal gyrus; More reference expression data
BioGPS	n/a
Gene ontology
Molecular function	triglyceride lipase activity; carboxylic ester hydrolase activity; hydrolase activity; metal ion binding; lipase activity; protein binding
Cellular component	extracellular region; extracellular space
Biological process	lipid catabolic process; positive regulation of triglyceride lipase activity; intestinal cholesterol absorption; lipid metabolism; retinoid metabolic process; lipid digestion
Sources:Amigo / QuickGO
Orthologs
Databases	NCBI: entry; OMA: entry
Species	Human	Mouse
Entrez	5406	69060
Ensembl	ENSG00000175535	ENSMUSG00000046008
UniProt	P16233	Q6P8U6
RefSeq (mRNA)	NM_000936	NM_026925
RefSeq (protein)	NP_000927	NP_081201
Location (UCSC)	Chr 10: 116.55 – 116.57 Mb	Chr 19: 58.64 – 58.67 Mb
PubMed search
- Wikidata
View/Edit Human	View/Edit Mouse

Pancreatic lipase, also known as pancreatic triacylglycerol lipase, is an enzyme that in humans is encoded by the PNIP gene. It is secreted from the pancreas, and is one of the primary lipase enzymes that hydrolyzes (breaks down) dietary fat molecules in the human digestive system.

== Function ==
Hydrolysis of a triglyceride 1

Pancreatic lipase is one of the main digestive enzymes, ultimately converting triglyceride substrates found in ingested oils to monoglycerides and free fatty acids.

Triacylglycerol + 2 H_{2}O $\rightleftharpoons$ 2-monoacylglycerol + 2 fatty acid anions

Bile salts secreted from the liver and stored in gallbladder are released into the duodenum, where they coat and emulsify large fat droplets into smaller droplets, thus increasing the overall surface area of the fat, which allows the lipase to break apart the fat more effectively. The resulting monomers (2 free fatty acids and one 2-monoacylglycerol) are then moved by way of peristalsis along the small intestine to be absorbed into the lymphatic system by a specialized vessel called a lacteal. This protein belongs to the pancreatic lipase family.

Unlike some pancreatic enzymes that are activated by proteolytic cleavage (e.g., trypsinogen), pancreatic lipase is secreted in its final form. However, it becomes efficient only in the presence of colipase in the duodenum.

== Medical significance ==
=== Diagnostic value ===
Pancreatic lipase is secreted from acinar cells into the duodenum through the duct system of the pancreas. Its concentration in serum is normally very low. Under extreme disruption of pancreatic function, such as pancreatitis or pancreatic adenocarcinoma, the pancreas may begin to autolyse and release pancreatic enzymes including pancreatic lipase into serum. Thus, through measurement of serum concentration of pancreatic lipase, acute pancreatitis can be diagnosed.

=== Inhibitors ===
Lipase inhibitors such as orlistat have been used as a treatment for obesity.
