= William Steere =

William Steere may refer to:

- William C. Steere Jr. (born 1936), chief executive officer of Pfizer
- William C. Steere (1907–1989), American botanist
- William Steere (priest) (died 1638), Irish Anglican priest

== See also ==
- William Steer (1888–1969), English amateur footballer
- William Bridgland Steer (1867–1939), British trade unionist and politician
