= Lotiglipron =

Chemical compound

Identifiers
- IUPAC name: 2-{[4-[(2S)-2-(5-chloropyridin-2-yl)-2-methyl-1,3-benzodioxol-4-yl]piperidin-1-yl]methyl}-3-{[(2S)-oxetan-2-yl]methyl}benzimidazole-5-carboxylic acid
- CAS Number: 2401892-75-7
- PubChem CID: 146609022
- ChemSpider: 129109088
- UNII: YI10W1K93A
- ChEMBL: ChEMBL5314631

Chemical and physical data
- Formula: C_{31}H_{31}ClN_{4}O_{5}
- Molar mass: 575.06 g·mol^{−1}
- 3D model (JSmol): Interactive image
- SMILES: C[C@]1(c2ccc(Cl)cn2)Oc2cccc(C3CCN(Cc4nc5ccc(C(=O)O)cc5n4C[C@@H]4CCO4)CC3)c2O1
- InChI: InChI=1S/C31H31ClN4O5/c1-31(27-8-6-21(32)16-33-27)40-26-4-2-3-23(29(26)41-31)19-9-12-35(13-10-19)18-28-34-24-7-5-20(30(37)38)15-25(24)36(28)17-22-11-14-39-22/h2-8,15-16,19,22H,9-14,17-18H2,1H3,(H,37,38)/t22-,31-/m0/s1; Key:SVPYZAJTWFQTSM-UGDMGKLASA-N

Lotiglipron is a non-peptide GLP-1 receptor agonist which was under development by Pfizer as a weight loss drug. However, it was withdrawn from development in June 2023, after early stage clinical trials showed elevated liver enzymes which could indicate potential for liver toxicity.

== See also ==
- Danuglipron
- Orforglipron
