= Danuglipron =

Chemical compound

Clinical data
- Other names: PF-06882961

Legal status
- Legal status: Investigational

Identifiers
- IUPAC name: 2-[[4-[6-[(4-Cyano-2-fluorophenyl)methoxy]pyridin-2-yl]piperidin-1-yl]methyl]-3-[[(2S)-oxetan-2-yl]methyl]benzimidazole-5-carboxylic acid
- CAS Number: 2230198-02-2
- PubChem CID: 134611040
- ChemSpider: 81367976
- UNII: DN9IUI24GP
- KEGG: D11910
- ChEBI: CHEBI:231951
- ChEMBL: ChEMBL4518483
- CompTox Dashboard (EPA): DTXSID601101457

Chemical and physical data
- Formula: C_{31}H_{30}FN_{5}O_{4}
- Molar mass: 555.610 g·mol^{−1}
- 3D model (JSmol): Interactive image
- SMILES: N#Cc1ccc(COc2cccc(C3CCN(Cc4nc5ccc(C(=O)O)cc5n4C[C@@H]4CCO4)CC3)n2)c(F)c1
- InChI: InChI=1S/C31H30FN5O4/c32-25-14-20(16-33)4-5-23(25)19-41-30-3-1-2-26(35-30)21-8-11-36(12-9-21)18-29-34-27-7-6-22(31(38)39)15-28(27)37(29)17-24-10-13-40-24/h1-7,14-15,21,24H,8-13,17-19H2,(H,38,39)/t24-/m0/s1; Key:HYBAKUMPISVZQP-DEOSSOPVSA-N

Danuglipron is a small-molecule GLP-1 receptor agonist, formerly under development by Pfizer that, in an oral formulation, was under investigation as a therapy for diabetes mellitus. Initial results from a randomized controlled trial indicated that it reduced weight and improved diabetic control. The most commonly reported adverse events were nausea, diarrhea, and vomiting. However, in April 2025, Pfizer announced it would abandon further development of danuglipron due to unpredictable liver toxicity.

== See also ==
- Lotiglipron
- Orforglipron
