= PF-06372222 =

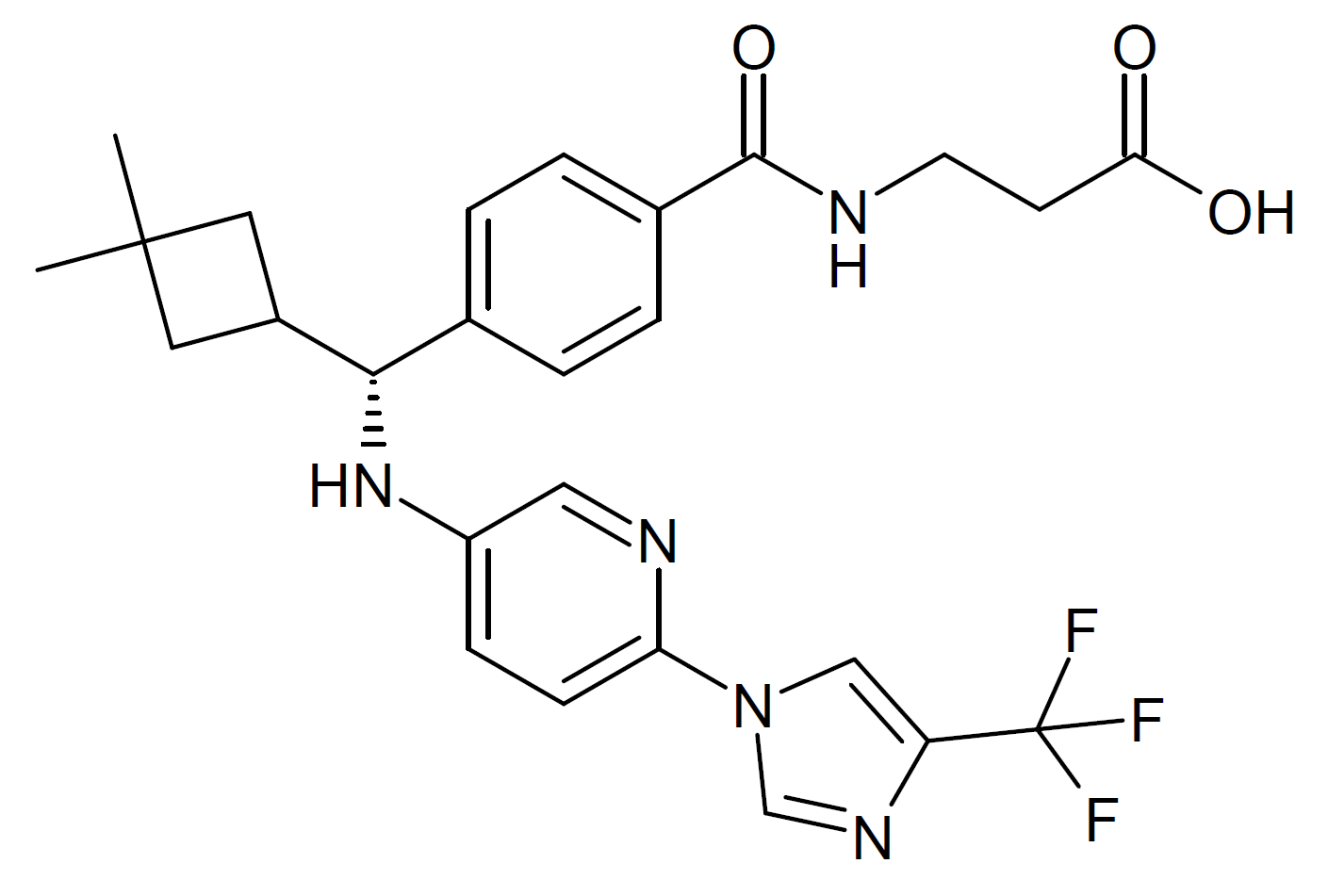

Clinical data
- ATC code: None

Identifiers
- IUPAC name: 3-[[4-[(R)-(3,3-dimethylcyclobutyl)-[[6-[4-(trifluoromethyl)imidazol-1-yl]-3-pyridinyl]amino]methyl]benzoyl]amino]propanoic acid
- CAS Number: 1407592-99-7
- PubChem CID: 68178630
- IUPHAR/BPS: 9575
- ChemSpider: 34450722
- ChEMBL: ChEMBL3648185
- PDB ligand: 97Y (PDBe, RCSB PDB)

Chemical and physical data
- Formula: C_{26}H_{28}F_{3}N_{5}O_{3}
- Molar mass: 515.537 g·mol^{−1}
- 3D model (JSmol): Interactive image
- SMILES: CC1(CC(C1)[C@H](C2=CC=C(C=C2)C(=O)NCCC(=O)O)NC3=CN=C(C=C3)N4C=C(N=C4)C(F)(F)F)C
- InChI: InChI=1S/C26H28F3N5O3/c1-25(2)11-18(12-25)23(16-3-5-17(6-4-16)24(37)30-10-9-22(35)36)33-19-7-8-21(31-13-19)34-14-20(32-15-34)26(27,28)29/h3-8,13-15,18,23,33H,9-12H2,1-2H3,(H,30,37)(H,35,36)/t23-/m0/s1; Key:MYZIDYJMNWEJMC-QHCPKHFHSA-N

PF-06372222 is a drug which acts as a potent and selective allosteric antagonist of both the glucagon receptor and the glucagon-like peptide-1 receptor (GLP-1). It was originally developed as a potential treatment for diabetes but was unsuccessful, however it has subsequently been used as a pharmacological tool compound for the study of the GLP-1 receptor and led to the discovery of non-peptide GLP-1 agonists such as orforglipron.

== See also ==
- HTL26119
