= Henry McKinnell =

American business executive (born 1943)

Henry A. McKinnell, Jr. (born February 23, 1943) is an American business executive, who served as the chief executive officer and chairman of the board of directors of Pfizer Inc. from 2001 to 2006/2007. He is also a director of Moody's.

== Career ==
Henry McKinnell was born in Victoria, British Columbia, Canada. His father was a ship captain. He originally worked towards a degree in chemistry but later changed his declared degree to business. He earned his bachelor's degree for business from the University of British Columbia in 1965. Later, he earned his master's and doctorate in business administration (finance subfield) from Stanford Business School.

His first job offer was for Pfizer, but he instead chose to work at American Standard for three years (1969–1971). He later joined Pfizer in early 1971. Over the course of the next 32 years, McKinnell climbed his way up several positions. He was named CEO as of January 2001 and named chairman in April 2001.

In 2003 he won the Woodrow Wilson Award for Corporate Citizenship. McKinnell was known as an aggressive and hard line advocate of trade sanctions against developing countries in disputes over patents and other intellectual property rights on medicines. In 2006, several Stanford alums asked that McKinnell be removed from an advisory board at the Stanford Business School, due to the aggressive use of litigation against the head of the Philippines regulatory agency.

Following falling share prices, McKinnell resigned the CEO position on July 28, 2006, amid dissatisfaction from the board of directors and declining investor confidence and was replaced by Jeff Kindler on that day. He was scheduled to remain as chairman until February 2007.

Pfizer was relatively conservative with regard to mega-mergers through stock-for-stock transactions through most of its history until McKinnell took the helm in 2001. Pfizer's per share price (adjusted for splits) went from about $50 to $30 from 1999 to 2006 during McKinnell's tenure. With roughly 7 billion shares outstanding, this reflects a loss in value of 140 billion dollars under McKinnell's leadership pursuing a strategy of growth via stock for stock acquisition.

It could be argued that some of the decline in Pfizer's market value during this time could be attributed to the overall decline in blue chip stocks from 1999 to 2001. However, many industry analysts criticized McKinnell for diluting shareholder value with these expensive stock-for-stock acquisitions that obviously paid a premium for the underlying value of the acquired company. Furthermore, internal contributions to the pipeline did not replace declining value nor did these M&A activities. However, McKinnell received record compensation which he staunchly defended against critics.

According to documents Pfizer filed with the Securities and Exchange Commission, McKinnell received a base salary in 2005 of $2,270,500, and a bonus of $3,700,000. He also received $145,814 in other compensation (primarily tax payments made by Pfizer on behalf of employees), and nearly $5.5 million in long-term incentive payouts. The value of his retirement package and deferred compensation will exceed $275,000,000.

McKinnell has, according to documents filed with the Federal Election Commission, donated mainly to Republican Party candidates. He has donated to George W. Bush, John Thune, Chuck Grassley, and others.
