= Charles F. Erhart =

Co-founder of Pfizer (1821–1891)

- Born: Karl Erhart; September 25, 1821; Ludwigsburg, Kingdom of Württemberg, Germany
- Died: December 27, 1891 (aged 70)
- Years active: 1849–1891
- Known for: Co-founder of Pfizer
- Spouse: Frances Pfizer (m. 1856–1891)
- Children: 5

Charles F. Erhart (born Karl Erhart; 25 September 1821– 27 December 1891) was a German-born businessman who co-founded the American pharmaceutical company Chas. Pfizer & Co. Inc. with Charles Pfizer, his cousin and, later, brother-in-law.

== Career ==
Like his cousin, Charles Pfizer, he was born in Ludwigsburg. Three years older than Pfizer, Erhart had mastered the confectioner's trade in his native town, and their skills blended well for the new business they founded together in Brooklyn, New York, in 1849. Chas. Pfizer & Co. produced fine chemicals, specializing in the compounding of chemicals not commonly made in America. The business started in a building that served as both a manufacturing plant and a research and development facility. Although Erhart was co-owner of the company, Pfizer was recognized as the senior partner.

Awards came early to the partners—from the American Institute in 1867 and the Centennial Exposition of 1876 in Philadelphia—whose first product, santonin, neatly combined the skill of Erhart, the confectioner, with that of his cousin, the chemist. The medicine, shaped like a candy cone, blended the bitter santonin with a sugar-cream confection to make it palatable.

Erhart maintained close ties with Germany, returning to his homeland both for social and business reasons. During one trip, Erhart proposed to Fanny Pfizer, the sister of his cousin Charles Pfizer, and then married her in New York in 1856. This union further strengthened the familial ties of the growing business partnership. Erhart's scientific and technical skills were instrumental in bringing about an expanded line of chemicals and a much larger manufacturing plant.

The Company's extensive connections in Europe enabled it to branch out into production of food-processing ingredients. In 1863, Erhart and Pfizer began importing crude argol — the tartar deposits formed in wine casks during the aging process—from France and Italy and set up their own refining operation for the manufacture of tartar and tartaric acid, which was used by bakers, beverage manufacturers, and in cooking. Sales began to climb, and by 1871, revenues of the young company were about $1.4 million.

Erhart died in 1891, at the age of 70. Upon Charles Erhart death, their partnership agreement stipulated that upon the death of one partner, the surviving partner could buy the other's share of the partnership for half its inventory value. Pfizer promptly exercised this option, paying his partner's heirs $119,350 for Erhart's half of the business. However in 1900, Pfizer distributed the stock of the company as follows: Charles Pfizer Jr. (334 shares), Emile Pfizer (333 shares), William Erhart (333 shares).

== Family ==
Charles married his cousin, Frances "Fannie" Pfizer, Charles Pfizer's sister, with whom he had at least four children:

- Clara Wilhelmine Julie Johanna Erhart (1857–1926); married Baron Crafft Truchseß von Wetzhausen in 1906.
- Carl (1861–1879)
- Fanny (1865–1941) Married Rudolf August Erbsloh (1858–1931)
- William (1868–1940), became vice president and co-owner of Chas. Pfizer & Co. Inc. in 1936; William H. Erhart became and remained chairman of the company until his death in July 1940.
