= HTL26119 =

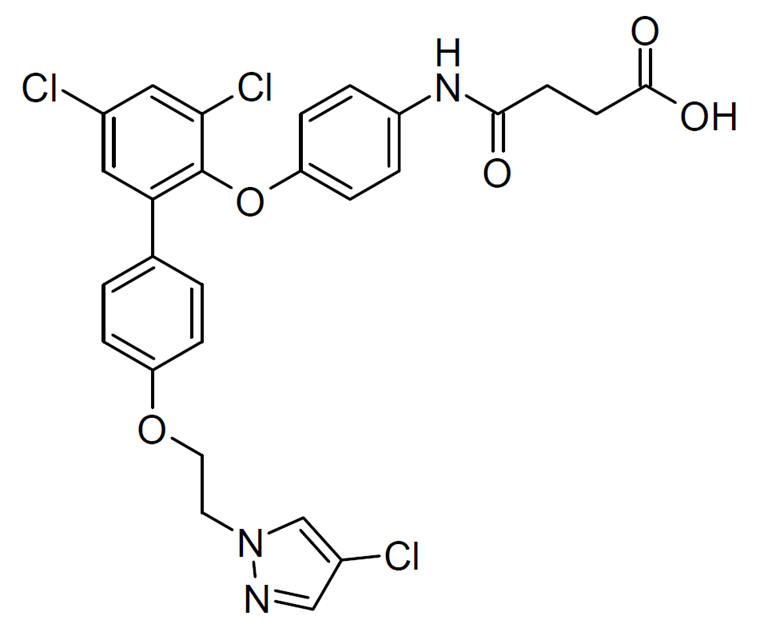

Clinical data
- ATC code: None

Identifiers
- IUPAC name: 5-[4-[2,4-dichloro-6-[4-[2-(4-chloropyrazol-1-yl)ethoxy]phenyl]phenoxy]phenyl]-4-oxopentanoic acid
- PubChem CID: 172873530

Chemical and physical data
- Formula: C_{28}H_{23}Cl_{3}N_{2}O_{5}
- Molar mass: 573.85 g·mol^{−1}
- 3D model (JSmol): Interactive image
- SMILES: C1=CC(=CC=C1CC(=O)CCC(=O)O)OC2=C(C=C(C=C2Cl)Cl)C3=CC=C(C=C3)OCCN4C=C(C=N4)Cl
- InChI: InChI=1S/C28H23Cl3N2O5/c29-20-14-25(19-3-8-23(9-4-19)37-12-11-33-17-21(30)16-32-33)28(26(31)15-20)38-24-6-1-18(2-7-24)13-22(34)5-10-27(35)36/h1-4,6-9,14-17H,5,10-13H2,(H,35,36); Key:DGUBCYZSWLRFKT-UHFFFAOYSA-N

HTL26119 is a drug which acts as a potent and selective negative allosteric modulator behaving as a functional antagonist of the glucagon-like peptide-1 receptor (GLP-1). While GLP-1 receptor agonists are widely used for the treatment of obesity and diabetes, there are few antagonists known for this receptor. However, these also have potential medical uses for indications where weight gain is desirable, such as treatment of sarcopenia in the elderly and cachexia in patients affected by conditions such as cancer and AIDS. While HTL26119 itself is unlikely to be developed for medical use, as one of the first selective antagonists for GLP-1 it has been widely used as a pharmacological tool compound for the study of the GLP-1 receptor and its signaling pathway.

== See also ==
- PF-06372222
