= Jeff Kindler =

American businessman (born 1955)

Jeffrey B. Kindler
- Born: May 13, 1955 (age 71)
- Education: Tufts University (BA) Harvard University (JD)
- Occupations: Healthcare executive, Private investor
- Organization: Centrexion Inc.
- Known for: Previously Pfizer CEO

Jeffrey B. Kindler (born May 13, 1955) is an American healthcare executive and investor. He was chairman and CEO of the pharmaceutical company Pfizer from 2006 to 2010. Kindler later was CEO of Centrexion Inc, and chairman of the GLG Institute.

== Career ==
=== Early career ===
Kindler earned his BA in 1977 from Tufts University summa cum laude and his JD in 1980 from Harvard Law School magna cum laude, where he was an editor of the Harvard Law Review.

Kindler was an attorney at the Federal Communications Commission. He was a law clerk to Judge David L. Bazelon of the United States Court of Appeals for the District of Columbia Circuit and later as a law clerk to U.S. Supreme Court Justice William J. Brennan Jr. Following his clerkship with Justice Brennan, Kindler practiced civil and criminal litigation at the Washington, D.C., firm of Williams & Connolly, where he became a partner.

=== 1990–2000 ===
In 1990, Kindler joined the legal team at General Electric. Kindler later became vice president of Litigation and Legal Policy. In 1994, Kindler worked with future Assistant Attorney General for the U.S. Department of Justice Antitrust Division William Baer and renowned trial lawyer Dan Webb on the winning litigation team tasked with defending GE against diamond price-fixing claims. Although GE was acquitted at trial, De Beers was also charged and subsequently pleaded guilty to keeping prices in the worldwide industrial diamond market artificially high.

In 1996, Kindler joined McDonald's Corporation as executive vice president and general counsel for legal and corporate affairs. After leading the acquisition of Boston Market, Kindler became president of Boston Market Corp. and then of Partner Brands, which consisted of all of McDonald's non-hamburger concepts, including Chipotle Mexican Grill, Donatos Pizza, and Pret a Manger.

=== 2001–2010 ===
In 2002, Kindler became the general counsel at Pfizer Inc., the largest research-based biopharmaceutical company in the world. In February 2005, Kindler was named vice chairman. Under Kindler's leadership as vice chairman and general counsel, Pfizer provided legal support for families of 9/11 victims, among other pro bono efforts. The Legal Aid Society recognized Pfizer for "creating the prototype for corporate pro bono," for which Kindler accepted the Pro Bono Publico and Public Service Corporate awards. He received the first GC Leadership Award in recognition of his work aiding low-income New Yorkers and the 2005 Exemplar Award from the National Legal Aid & Defender Association (NLADA) for his service to the community.

On July 28, 2006, Pfizer's board of directors selected Kindler to succeed Henry A. McKinnell Jr. as chief executive officer. Later in 2006, Kindler was given the additional role of chairman.

In 2009, Kindler oversaw Pfizer's $68 billion acquisition of Wyeth. The acquisition gave Pfizer access to Wyeth's entire product line, eight late-stage clinical trials, and four compounds awaiting FDA approval.

Kindler established Pfizer's program to distribute more than 70 of its medications for free to people who meet certain criteria, including job loss and the absence of prescription drug insurance. Kindler also collaborated with former president Bill Clinton's Clinton Global Initiatives on a range of programs to reduce the costs of essential medicines for AIDS patients in developing markets.

In March 2010, Kindler was named chairman of Pharmaceutical Research and Manufacturers of America.

Kindler retired from Pfizer in 2010.

=== 2011–present ===
Kindler became CEO of Centrexion Corp, a biotechnology company based in Baltimore, Maryland, in 2013.

Kindler is a director of Starboard Capital Partners, a private equity firm, Operating Partner at Artis Ventures, Global Chair of the GLG Institute. Kindler also is on the boards of a number of public and privately held companies, including Precigen Inc., PPD, Siga Technologies, vTv Therapeutics and Perrigo Company. He was formerly member of President Obama's Management Advisory Board.

== Philanthropy ==
In 2011, Kindler was elected to the board of directors for The National Center on Addiction and Substance Abuse at Columbia University (CASA Columbia). He also has been on the boards of the Manhattan Theater Club and Tufts University. He has been on the boards of the Ronald McDonald House Charities, Catalyst, United Way of New York City, the Legal Aid Society of New York, and Lincoln Center for the Performing Arts.

== See also ==
- List of law clerks for the third seat of the Supreme Court of the United States
