= Charles Pfizer =

German-American businessman and chemist (1824–1906)

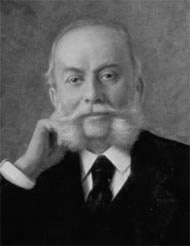
- Pfizer, c. 1894
- Born: Karl Christian Friedrich Pfizer; March 22, 1824; Ludwigsburg, Kingdom of Württemberg
- Died: October 19, 1906 (aged 82); Newport, Rhode Island, U.S.
- Occupation: Chemist
- Years active: 1849–1900
- Known for: Co-founder of Pfizer
- Spouse: Anna Hausch (m. 1859)
- Children: 6

Karl Christian Friedrich Pfizer (German: [kaʁl ˈpfɪtsɐ]; March 22, 1824 – October 19, 1906), known as Charles Pfizer, was a German-American businessman and chemist who co-founded the Pfizer pharmaceutical company with his cousin, Charles F. Erhart, in 1849, as Chas. Pfizer & Co. Inc.

== Life and family ==
He was born Karl Christian Friedrich to Karl Frederick Pfizer and Caroline Klotz. Like his older cousin, future business partner and brother-in-law, Karl Erhart, Pfizer was born in Ludwigsburg, Kingdom of Württemberg (now Germany). During his early years, he worked as an apothecary's apprentice. He emigrated to the United States in October 1848.

Pfizer married Anna Hausch, in 1859, in his hometown of Ludwigsburg. He met Hausch during one of his trips to Europe to establish contacts with exporters of raw materials. The couple had six children, five of whom survived to adulthood: Charles Jr (1860–1928), Gustavus (1861–1944), Emile (1864–1941), Helen Julia (born 1866, who married Sir Frederick Duncan, 2nd Baronet), Alice (who married Baron Bachofen von Echt of Austria), and Ann (1875–1876). Charles and Emile also worked for Pfizer's company. The family lived at Brooklyn's upscale Clinton Hill. Pfizer built a Lutheran Church in New York.

== Career ==
In 1849, he borrowed US$2,500 from his father to buy a commercial building in Williamsburg, Brooklyn. He then co-founded Chas. Pfizer & Co. Inc. Due to Pfizer's experience in chemistry and his partner's background as a confectioner, the company was initially engaged in the manufacture of food flavorings, iodine preparations, and citric acid for softdrink production. They also produced santonin, an antiparasitic, later expanding production to other chemicals.

Pfizer's partner and cousin, Charles F. Erhart, also wed his sister, Frances, becoming his brother-in-law. When Erhart died, in 1891, their partnership agreement came into effect, which stipulated that the surviving partner could buy the other's share of the company for half of its inventory value. Pfizer promptly exercised this option, paying his partner's heirs $119,350 for Erhart's half of the business. He remained as the head of the company for 51 years, until 1900, when it was incorporated. Charles Pfizer Jr. then became the company's first president; he was later succeeded by his brother, Emile.

== 1906 injury and death ==
Pfizer died on October 19, 1906 at his summer home, "Lindgate", in Newport, Rhode Island; his main residence was in Clinton Hill, Brooklyn. His death followed a fall down stairs, a few weeks prior, in which he broke an arm and was further injured. He was buried at New York's Green-Wood Cemetery.
