= Pfizer Building =

Building in Manhattan, New York

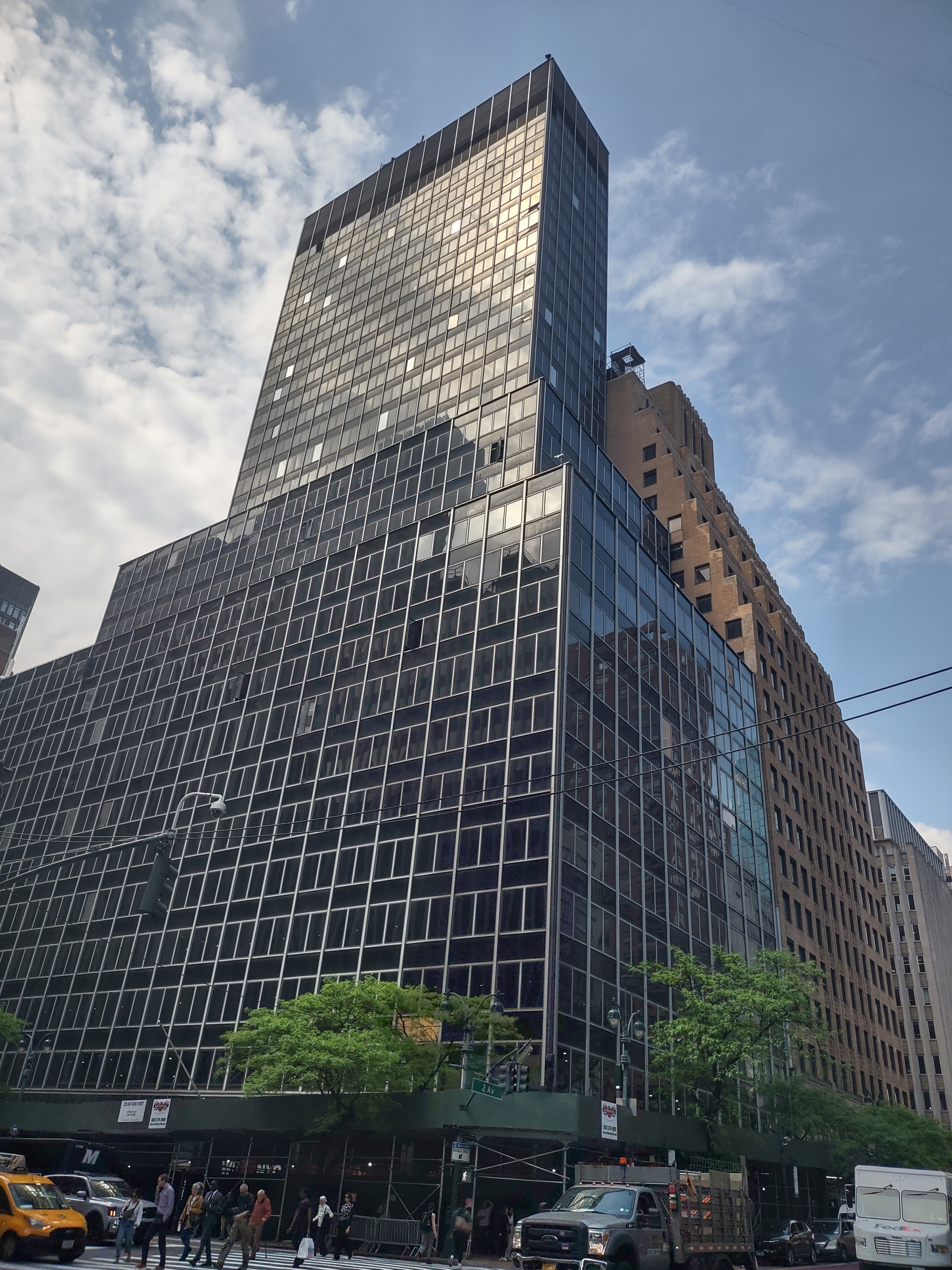
- The Pfizer Building in 2025

General information
- Status: Under renovation
- Architectural style: International Style
- Location: 235 E 42nd St., Manhattan, New York, New York, U.S.
- Coordinates: 40°45′1″N 73°58′21″W
- Year built: 1960

Height
- Height: 409 feet (125 m)

Technical details
- Floor count: 33

Design and construction
- Architect: Emery Roth & Sons

The Pfizer Building is a skyscraper on 42nd Street in the East Midtown neighborhood of Manhattan, New York City, New York, U.S. The structure consists of two formerly separate buildings at 219 and 235 East 42nd Street, which housed the pharmaceutical company Pfizer. The older building at 219 East 42nd Street, completed in 1905, was originally a 10-story building. The building at 235 East 42nd Street, designed by Emery Roth & Sons in the International Style, was constructed in 1960 and has 33 stories.

Both buildings have been undergoing a conversion to residential use since 2024. The project includes constructing 1,600 apartments and expanding 219 East 42nd Street to 29 stories. The building was evacuated during the conversion on July 7, 2026, after two columns began to buckle; this prompted fears of a collapse and required part of the additions to be rebuilt.

== Description ==
=== Original structures ===
The Pfizer Building is composed of two structures. 219 East 42nd Street has 350,000 square feet (33,000 m^{2}) of space across 10 stories. The original facade was replaced in 1963 with a green glass facade.

The building at 235 East 42nd Street has 823,623 square feet (76,517 m^{2}) of space. Measuring 409 feet (125 m) high with 33 stories, the building was designed by Emery Roth & Sons in the International Style. When built, the structure had a frontage of 225 feet (69 m) on 42nd Street to the south and 125 feet (38 m) on 43rd Street to the north. 235 East 42nd Street has setbacks on its 42nd Street facade at the 11th and 15th stories. It originally had a glass-and-aluminum facade.

The interior floor slabs are nearly 200 feet (61 m) wide. Nikos Bel-Jon was commissioned to create a mural titled Medical Research Through the Ages at 235 East 42nd Street, measuring 36 by 11 feet (11.0 by 3.4 m) across. Bel-Jon's mural was composed of tin and aluminum panels, which depicted various figures in the medical industry throughout history, including the physician Hippocrates, the microbiologist Alexander Fleming, and the chemist Louis Pasteur. The upper stories had mechanical ducts underneath the floor slabs.

=== Residential conversion ===
As part of the structures' 2020s residential conversion, the space is being divided into 1,600 apartments, and nineteen additional floors are being built atop 219 East 42nd Street. Due to zoning rules, the floor slabs are being subdivided. The conversion also includes 100,000 square feet (9,300 m^{2}) of amenities such as a fitness center and a rooftop swimming pool. In addition all 2,000 windows are being replaced during the residential conversion. The original windows could not be opened, but zoning regulations stipulated that all apartments have at least one window that could be opened.

== History ==
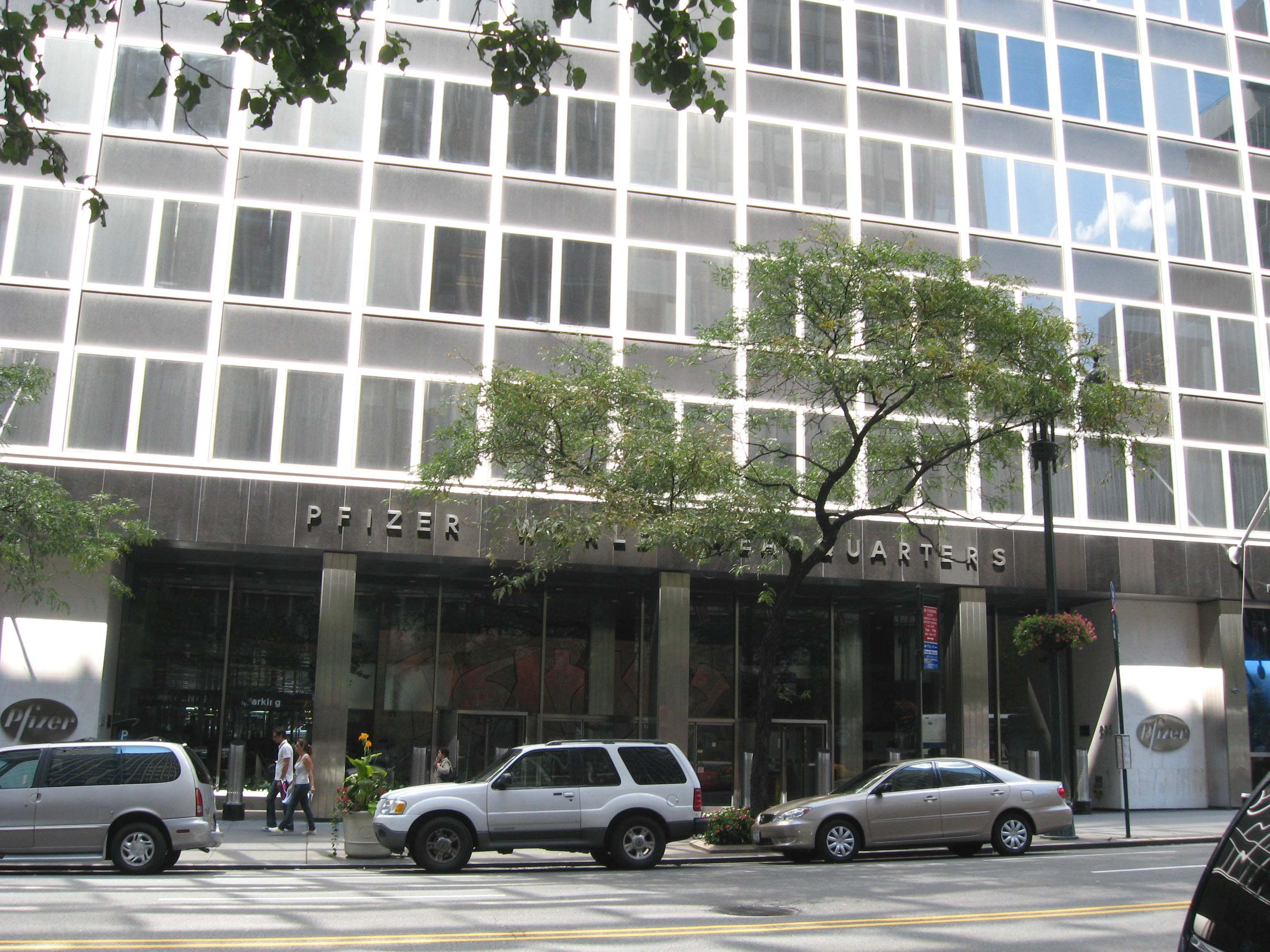
The main entrance

=== Early history ===
The structure at 219 East 42nd Street was completed in 1910 and was renovated in 1963. Plans for a 32-story office building next door at 235 East 42nd Street, at the northwest corner with Second Avenue, were filed in early 1959. The structure, designed by Emery Roth & Sons and constructed by the Diesel Construction Company, would house the pharmaceutical company Pfizer's international offices and some domestic offices. A groundbreaking ceremony took place on June 4, 1959, and Pfizer moved into 235 East 42nd Street in April 1961.

Initially, Pfizer occupied 18 floors at 235 East 42nd Street, employing 1,000 workers there. Among the structure's other early tenants was the manufacturer Electrolux, the Taiwanese mission to the United Nations, the Alexander Hamilton Institute, and a branch of Chase Manhattan Bank. At the time of its opening, 235 East 42nd Street was 85% occupied. In 1963, The New York Times described 235 East 42nd Street as one of several structures built as part of a "building boom" on Second Avenue between 40th and 45th streets.

Pfizer expanded its headquarters in 1974. Hoffmann Architects renovated 235 East 42nd Street in 1998, adding an artwork by Brian Clarke to the ceiling. The two structures were insufficient for Pfizer's headquarters. The company acquired a nearby building at 685 Third Avenue in 2003, at which point it leased space in five other buildings in the area, including the Daily News Building just south of 235 East 42nd Street.

=== Pfizer sale and Werner purchase ===
In late 2016, Pfizer announced its intention to sell both of its 42nd Street buildings and move its headquarters to another Manhattan building. Pfizer placed the 42nd Street buildings for sale in early 2017 and signed a lease at The Spiral at Hudson Yards in 2018, intending to relocate there. In April, David Werner tentatively agreed to buy the buildings. In July, Werner, Alexandria Real Estate Equities, Deutsche Bank, and the State of Wisconsin Investment Board bought 219 and 235 East 42nd Street for $363.5 million. The acquisition was funded by a $150 million loan from Morgan Stanley. Public records indicate that the partners paid $228 million for 235 East 42nd Street, excluding the land, and $142 million for 219 East 42nd Street. Pfizer signed a five-year leaseback agreement for both buildings, allowing it to continue occupying the buildings temporarily.

Werner leased the land under 235 East 42nd Street, paying Bernard Kayden $407 million. Sources disagree on whether the leasehold was acquired in 2018 or 2021. Alexandria initially wanted to redevelop 219 East 42nd Street as a life-sciences building after Pfizer's lease expired. Pfizer's Hudson Yards headquarters formally opened in April 2023, leaving the 42nd Street building vacant.

=== Residential conversion ===
In early 2024, Metro Loft Management tentatively agreed to buy just less than half of Werner's ownership stake in the development. Metro Loft and David Werner announced plans to convert the building into 1,500 apartments, which would make it the largest commercial-to-residential conversion project in New York City. Initially, none of the units would have been affordable housing units. Interior demolition commenced in mid-2024. Metro Loft and Werner did not plan to keep Bel-Jon's mural, which Pfizer had not taken with them to Hudson Yards, leading to concern that the mural could be destroyed. Bel-Jon's daughters were also unable to relocate their father's mural on their own, and ultimately Pfizer agreed to take back the mural. The project was expected to cost several hundreds of millions of dollars; in August 2024, Northwind Group gave Metro Loft and Werner a $75 million loan for 219 East 42nd Street. That October, Metro Loft and Werner obtained Alexandria's portion of 235 East 42nd Street's ground lease for $18 million.

Northwind Group loaned $135 million for the residential conversion in January 2025. Gensler publicly announced plans for the building's redesign the same month. By then, Werner and Metro Loft had plans for 1,600 apartments, of which 25 percent would be affordable housing; this would make the Pfizer Building the largest office-to-residential conversion in the United States. 219 East 42nd Street was planned to be expanded to 29 stories.

In February 2025, Werner bought the final portion of 235 East 42nd Street's site from Bernard Kayden, giving him and Metro Loft full ownership of Pfizer's 42nd Street buildings. In April, Metro Loft and Werner sought an additional $700 million loan for the project. The building was planned to receive a $467 million tax exemption for its affordable-housing units. That May, Madison Realty Capital agreed to provide a $720 million loan for the project. Between July 2025 and July 2026, the New York City Department of Buildings (DOB) issued seven construction-safety violations to general contractor Robert Travis.

==== Structural deterioration and evacuation ====
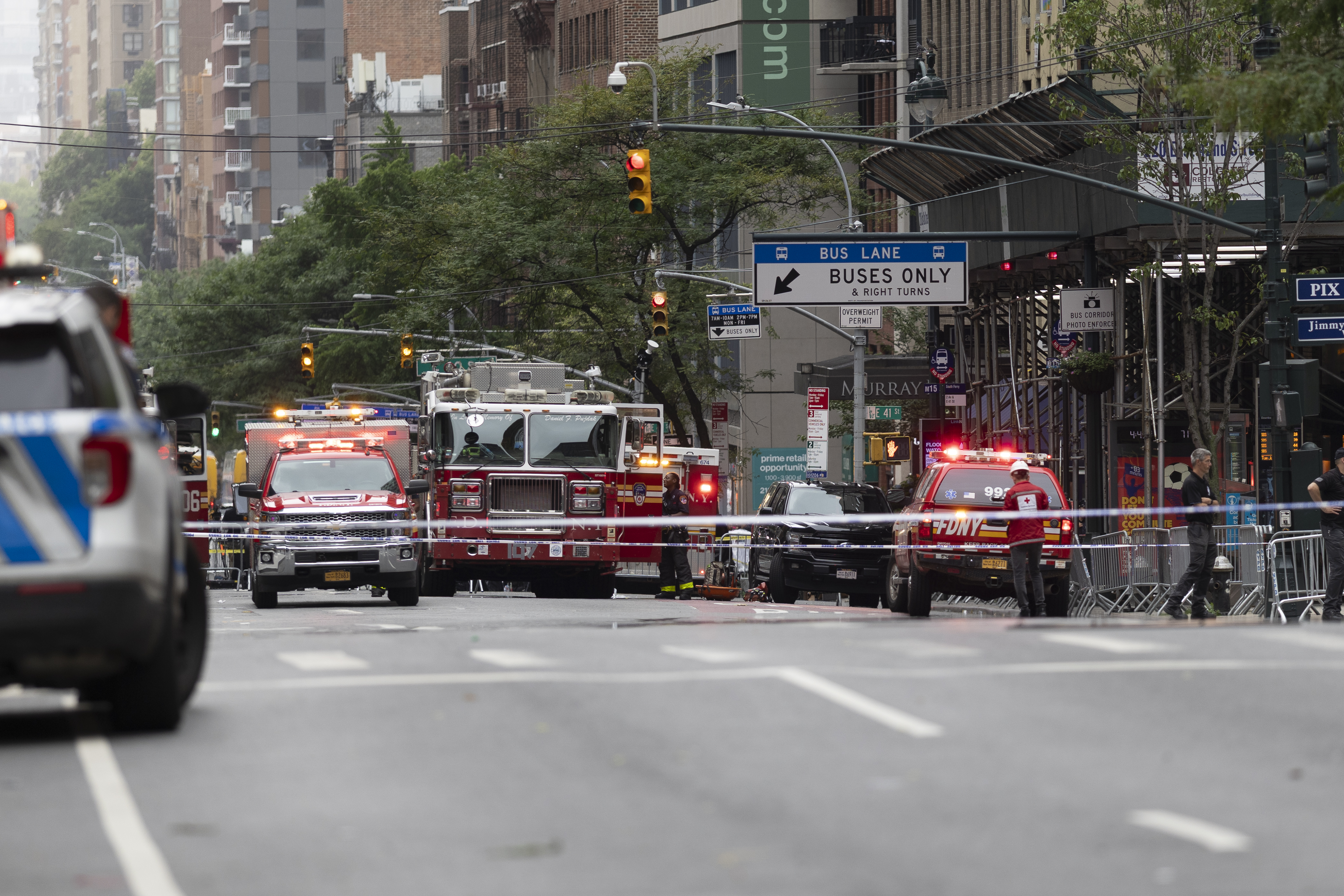
FDNY and NYPD response outside the building on July 7, 2026

On July 7, 2026, the building was evacuated after reports of structural deterioration. Falling bricks from the facade were reported to the New York City Fire Department, and a steamfitter observed cracks on the 22nd floor and a bent column on the 21st floor. Investigations and videos showed that some of the upper floors were sagging, structural members had buckled, windows had burst from their frames, and at least two wide flange columns had collapsed or were otherwise damaged. Officials deemed the building to be at risk of collapse, and it and nearby buildings were evacuated. Contractors were allowed into the building that evening to begin shoring the structure, as there had been no further buckling. Manhattan borough president Brad Hoylman-Sigal announced that, per the DOB, the building was not at risk of further collapse. By July 9, shoring had been added on all floors above the ninth.

The structural deterioration was attributed to the weight of the new floors and the lack of reinforcements on existing columns. Metro Loft said the incident would not delay the conversion process, and announced plans to rebuild the floors that had buckled, and to demolish and reconstruct the 15 newly added floors. Nathan Berman of Metro Loft described the structural issues as exaggerated and predicted that work would resume within several weeks. The Real Deal magazine wrote that a full investigation could last up to several weeks or months. News media wrote that the building's finances could be jeopardized by delays due to the incident, and that the development could be subject to litigation. The city government opened a criminal inquiry into the building and closed 43rd Street for two weeks while the building was stabilized. Subsequent investigations in August 2026 found that eight other columns had been improperly reinforced, apart from those that had buckled. That October, the city government approved plans to re-raise the damaged floors.
