= Medivation =

American biopharmaceutical company

Medivation, Inc.
- Type: Public
- Traded as: Nasdaq: MDVN
- Industry: Pharmaceutical industry
- Founded: 2004; 22 years ago
- Defunct: 2016
- Fate: Acquired by Pfizer
- Headquarters: San Francisco, California, United States
- Key people: David Hung & Steve Gorlin
- Website: medivation.com

Medivation, Inc. was an American biopharmaceutical company focused on development of novel therapies to treat serious diseases for which there are limited treatment options. Medivation was headquartered in San Francisco, California, beginning operations in December 2004 with the acquisition of Medivation Neurology, Inc. Its final CEO was David Hung.

Medivation, in collaboration with Astellas, was in development of enzalutamide for multiple stages of prostate cancer and for breast cancer. On August 31, 2012, Medivation and Astellas announced that the U.S. Food and Drug Administration (FDA) granted approval to XTANDI (enzalutamide) capsules for the treatment of patients with metastatic castration-resistant prostate cancer who have previously received docetaxel. XTANDI is an oral, once-daily androgen receptor inhibitor.

Pfizer announced it would acquire the company in August 2016 for $14 billion and completed the acquisition in October 2016.

== Company history ==
Steve Gorlin and David Hung founded Medivation in 2003. After watching a 28-year-old breast cancer patient die during his oncology fellowship David Hung said he must do something about it.

=== 2010 – Class action lawsuit ===
On March 3, 2010, Medivation's stock dropped $27.15 per share to close at $13.10, a 67% one-day decline on volume of 45 million shares. In response, a security fraud class-action lawsuit was initiated by Izard Nobel LLP, alleging that Medivation made false and misleading statements regarding the effectiveness of Dimebon as a treatment for Alzheimer's disease, before being revealed that it did not meet primary and secondary goals in a Phase 3 trial for patients with mild to moderate Alzheimer's disease.

The counsel for the case was Bernstein Liebhard and the lead plaintiffs were initially David Applestein then Catoosa Fund, LP. On March 22, 2012, the case was dismissed with prejudice. The plaintiffs appealed the dismissal in the Ninth Circuit Court of Appeals. The Ninth Circuit granted oral argument which was held on Friday, January 17, 2014. On March 7, 2014, the Ninth Circuit affirmed the dismissal of the class action, Catoosa Fund LP v. Medivation, Inc., No. 12-15960. The Ninth Circuit stated "With the exception of the tenuous and unattributed statement that Dr. Schneider relates secondhand, plaintiff has not pled any facts supporting an inference of actual knowledge by defendants. Plaintiff relies heavily on the inference that, due to their positions, the defendants must have known about the unmatched nature of the study. That inference is entirely speculative and does not rise to the required strong inference; plaintiff's allegation is not at least as compelling as any opposing inference one could draw from the facts alleged."

=== 2016 ===
In April, the company was linked with a number of potential acquirers including Roche, AstraZeneca, Amgen and Gilead Sciences, and a possible hostile bid from Sanofi. AstraZeneca was reported to weigh in with an offer of £7 billion ($10 billion). On April 29, Sanofi launched a $9.3 billion takeover offer which was rejected by the Medivation board.

Other suitors were Celgene and Genentech, which ultimately lost to Pfizer.

In August, Pfizer announced that it would acquire the company for $14 billion or $81.50 per share, a 21% premium over the closing price on August 19; the acquisition was completed September 28, 2016.

== Awards ==
Medivation CEO David Hung was the EY Entrepreneur of the Year 2014 National Winner.
