= William C. Steere =

American botanist & bryologist (1907–1989)

William Campbell Steere
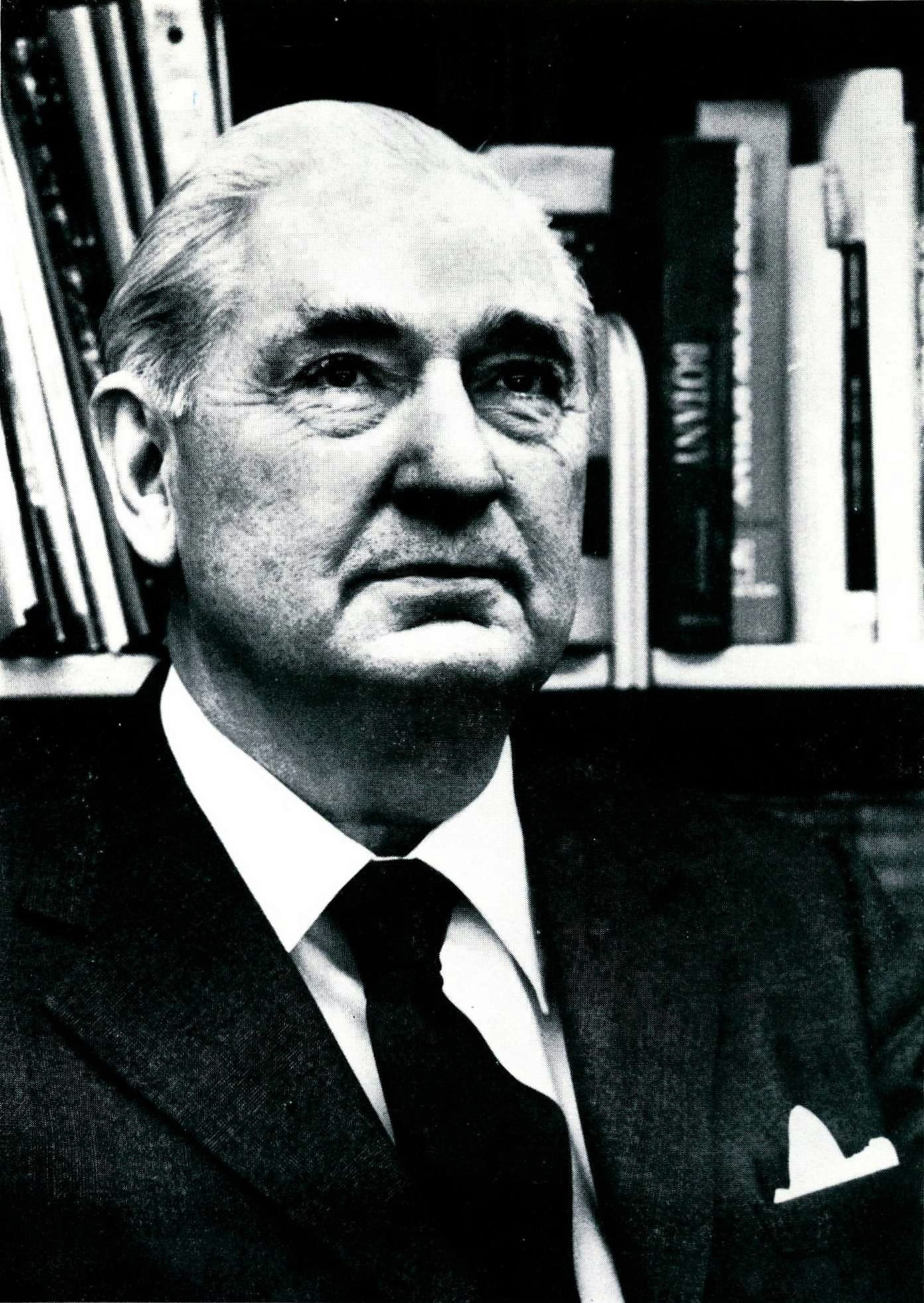
- W. C. Steere
- Born: November 4, 1907; Muskegon, Michigan
- Died: February 7, 1989 (aged 81); Bronxville, New York
- Education: University of Michigan
- Children: 3, including William C. Steere Jr.
- Awards: Mary Soper Pope Memorial Award
- Scientific career
- Fields: Botany
- Workplaces: Temple University; University of Michigan; Stanford University; New York Botanical Garden
- Author abbrev. (botany): Steere

William Campbell Steere (1907–1989) was an American botanist known as an expert on bryophytes, especially arctic and tropical American species. The standard author abbreviation Steere is used to indicate this person as the author when citing a botanical name.

== Early life ==
Steere was born November 4, 1907, in Muskegon, Michigan to a family of Irish Quakers. His paternal grandfather was Joseph Beal Steere. Steere attended the University of Michigan, and earned his B.S. in botany with "high distinction". He briefly attended the University of Pennsylvania where he studied cytology under William Randolph Taylor, while also working as an instructor at Temple University. Steere was persuaded by Harley H. Bartlett to return to the University of Michigan as an instructor. He earned his M.A. in 1931 and his Ph.D. from the university in 1932.

== Career ==
Steere continued to teach botany at the University of Michigan. His research was focused on bryology, and he taught courses in bryology and systematic biology with a focus on Michigan's Upper Peninsula. In 1932, he led a biological survey of the Yucatan. In 1935, he spent a year at the University of Puerto Rico as an exchange professor. Between 1942 and 1946, Steere led expeditions in Latin America searching for Cinchona and sources of quinine, dubbed the Cinchona Mission. He became a full professor at the University of Michigan in 1946 and Chair of the Botany Department in 1947. In 1948 and 1949, Steere studied effects of naturally occurring radioactivity on plant life at Great Bear Lake and in Alaska. He was the first bryologist to visit the northern slopes of the American Arctic Mountains.

Steere, starting in 1950, spent eight years at Stanford University as professor and dean of the Graduate Division. Between 1954 and 1955, Steere took a sabbatical from Stanford and accepted a one-year position with the National Science Foundation as Program Director in Systematic Biology. He became involved with Biological Abstracts and BIOSIS. In 1958, Steere joined the New York Botanical Garden as director. Steere assumed the title of Senior Scientist in 1973, before formally retiring from the Garden in 1977. In 1975 and 1976 he issued the exsiccata series Bryophyta Arctica exsiccata with Kjeld Axel Holmen and Gert Steen Mogensen as co-editors from Danmark. As President Emeritus, however, Steere continued his bryological research at the Garden until his death on February 7, 1989.

== Legacy ==
Steere is commemorated in the names of the plant genera, mainly liverworts; Steereocolea R.M.Schust. 1968 (Balantiopsaceae), Steerea S.Hatt. & Kamim. 1971 (Jubulaceae), Steereobryon G.L.Sm. 1971 (Polytrichaceae), Steerella Kuwah. 1973 (Metzgeriaceae), Steereochila Inoue 1987 (Plagiochilaceae, listed as doubtful genera), and Steereomitrium E.O.Campb. 1987 (Haplomitriaceae, listed as doubtful genera). He is the namesake of many species.

The New York Botanical Garden bryophyte herbarium was named the William C. Steere Bryophyte Herbarium in 2000, and it contains over 600,000 specimens. The Garden has also established the William Campbell Steere Fund to help bryologists who wish to visit their herbarium and library.

Mount Steere in Antarctica is named for him.

Steere's son, William C. Steere Jr., was CEO of Pfizer from 1991 to 2001, and chairman of the board emeritus from 2001 to 2011. He also served as vice chairman of the New York Botanical Garden's Board.

== Awards ==
In 1970, Steere was the last recipient of the Mary Soper Pope Memorial Award in botany. In 1972, he was awarded the Order of the Sacred Treasure from Emperor Hirohito for his work on the US-Japan Cooperative Science Program. In 1987, the International Association of Bryologists awarded him with the Hedwig Medal.

== Selected publications ==
- Steere, William C. 1935. The Mosses of Yucatán. Reprinted Lancaster Press, 14 pp.
- Steere, William C. 1946. Cenozoic and Mesozoic Bryophytes of North America. Ed. The University Press, 30 pp.
- Steere, William C. 1947. The Bryophyte Flora of Michigan, 24 pp.
- Steere, William C.; Anderson, Lewis E.; Bryan, Virginia S. 1954. Chromosome Studies on California Mosses. Vv. 20 & 24 from Memoirs of the Torrey Botanical Club, 74 pp.
- Steere, William C. 1958. Fifty Years of Botany, ed. W.C. Steere & McGraw-Hill, 638 pp.
- Steere, William C. 1961. The Bryophytes of South Georgia. Reprinted, 25 pp.
- Steere, William C. 1964. Liverworts of Southern Michigan. Bull. 17: Cranbrook Institute of Sci. 97 pp.
- Steere, William C. 1976. Ecology, Phytogeography and Floristics of Arctic Alaskan Bryophytes. Reprinted Hattori Bot. Lab. 26 pp.
- Steere, William C. 1978. North American Muscology and Muscologists: A Brief History. The Botanical Review 43 (3): 1-59
- Steere, William C; Brassard, Guy R. 1978. Bryophytorum bibliotheca, Studies in austral temperate rain forest bryophytes. Bryophytorum bibliotheca 14, ed. ilustr. by J. Cramer, 508 pp.
