= Karl Sax =

American botanist and geneticist (1892–1973)

- Born: November 2, 1892; Spokane, Washington, USA
- Died: October 8, 1973 (aged 80)
- Education: Washington State College, Bussey Institution, Harvard University (DSc 1922)
- Known for: Research in cytogenetics and the effect of radiation on chromosomes
- Spouse: Hally Jolivette
- Children: Three sons
- Awards: Mary Soper Pope Memorial Award in botany
- Scientific career
- Fields: Botany, genetics
- Institutions: University of California, Berkeley; Riverbank Laboratories, Geneva, Illinois; Maine Agricultural Experiment Station, Orono, Maine; Harvard University
- Academic advisors: E. B. Babcock
- Author abbrev. (botany): Sax

Karl Sax (November 2, 1892 – October 8, 1973) was an American botanist and geneticist, noted for his research in cytogenetics and the effect of radiation on chromosomes.

== Early life and education ==
Sax was born in Spokane, Washington, in 1892. His parents were pioneer farmers and active in civic affairs; his father was the mayor of Colville, Washington. Sax's early education was in the Colville schools, and in 1912 he continued his studies at Washington State College. He majored in agriculture, and his subsequent decision to undertake graduate work was influenced by the botanist and plant breeder Edward Gaines.

In college, he met and married Hally Jolivette, his cytology teacher, and they later had three sons. Following his graduation, Hally accepted a position at Wellesley College in Wellesley, Massachusetts, and they moved to the East Coast in 1916. Sax enrolled in the doctoral program at the Bussey Institution Graduate School of Applied Biology at Harvard University in Cambridge, Massachusetts, and completed his MA in 1917.

He went on to do his doctoral work at Harvard University, receiving his D.Sc. in 1922.

He served as a private in the US Army from 1917 to 1918 in World War I.

== Scientific career ==
In 1918, Sax took a job as an instructor in the Department of Genetics at the University of California, Berkeley, where he worked with E. B. Babcock on the genetics of the genus Crepis. In 1920 he took an appointment at the Riverbank Laboratories in Geneva, Illinois, working on wheat genetics, but he moved on from that job soon after when he took a position at the Maine Agricultural Experiment Station in Orono, Maine.

In 1928, he left Orono to take a teaching position in Harvard's genetics department at the Bussey Institution. However, the department was dissolved before his arrival, and he transferred to the cytology department at the university's Biological Laboratories in Cambridge, Massachusetts.

=== Contribution to radiation cytology ===
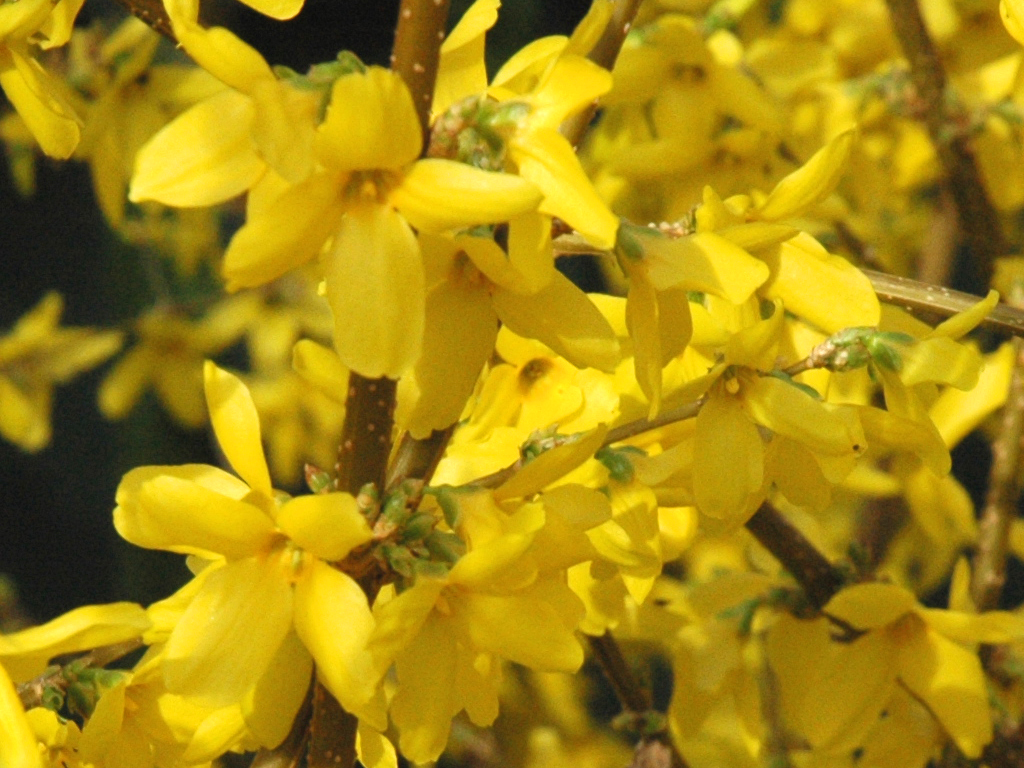
Forsythia x intermedia 'Karl Sax'

In 1938 Sax published a paper on chromosome aberrations, which demonstrated that radiation could induce major genetic changes by affecting chromosomal translocations, a chromosome abnormality. The paper is thought to mark the beginning of the field of radiation cytology, and led him to be called the "father of radiation cytology."

=== Plant breeding ===
Sax bred new varieties of ornamental trees and shrubs including Malus species (both apples and crabapples), magnolias, forsythias, and cherries. He hybridized two Japanese cherries, Prunus subhirtella and Prunus x yedoensis, then back-crossed the resulting hybrid with P. subhirtella, and named his cross Prunus Hally Jolivette, in honor of his wife.

A cultivar of Forsythia bred by Sax was named 'Karl Sax' by a nurseryman. In 1946, he was appointed acting director of Harvard's Arnold Arboretum, becoming the director in 1947, a post he held until 1954.

=== Demography ===
Sax was also interested in human demography. In 1955, he wrote Standing Room Only: The Challenge to Overpopulation, on the consequences of uncontrolled human population growth. Sax became associated with Planned Parenthood and was a member of the Population Association of America.

== Honors ==
Sax was an elected member of the National Academy of Sciences and the American Academy of Arts and Sciences. In 1966, he and Hally were co-recipients of the Mary Soper Pope Memorial Award in botany.

In 1959, he retired and moved to Media, Pennsylvania, where he continued his work on plant breeding.

Karl Sax died on October 8, 1973, aged 80, at Bryn Mawr Hospital, Bryn Mawr, Pennsylvania, U.S.
