= Hally Jolivette Sax =

American botanist (1884-1979)

- Born: Hally Delilia Mary Jolivette; June 22, 1884; La Crosse, Wisconsin, U.S.
- Died: March 20, 1979 (aged 94)
- Education: University of Wisconsin; Stanford University
- Occupation: Botanist

Hally Delilia Mary Sax (née Jolivette; June 22, 1884 – March 20, 1979), was an American botanist known for her work on the chromosomal structure of plant species and how it is affected by radiation and other mutagens.

== Biography ==
Jolivette received her A.B. in 1906 and her A.M. in 1909 — both from the University of Wisconsin — and her Ph.D. from Stanford University in 1912. She taught at the University of Wisconsin (1907–10), Stanford (1910–12), and Washington State College (1912–14). While at the latter institution, she met and, in 1915, married the botanist Karl Sax, one of her cytology students. They later had three sons.

She worked for a year for the U.S. Department of Agriculture (1914–15) before taking up a position as an instructor of botany in 1916 at Wellesley College in Wellesley, Massachusetts. It appears she taught there at least five years. She often collaborated with her husband, Karl Sax, on chromosomal studies, especially those related to the effects of radiation and chemicals on chromosomal structure.

== Publications ==
Solo authored

- Spore-formation in Geoglossum glabrum Pers. (1910)
- Spore-formation in Philocopra coeruleotecta (1918)
- Chromosome numbers in Quercus (1930)
- Chromosome pairing in Larix species (1932)
- Polyploidy and apomixis in Cotoneaster (1954)
- Polyploidy in Enkianthus (Ericaceae) (1960)

Coauthored

- Chromosome behavior in a genus cross (1924, with Karl Sax)
- Chromosome number and morphology in the conifers (1933, with Karl Sax)
- Chromosome structure and behavior in mitosis and meiosis (1935, with Karl Sax)
- Stomata size and distribution in diploid and polyploid plants (1937, with Karl Sax)
- The cytogenetics of generic hybrids of Sorbus (1947, with Karl Sax)
- Cycasin: Radiomimetic effects (1965, with Karl Sax and H.J. Teas)
- Radiomimetic beverages, drugs, and mutagens (1966, with Karl Sax)
- Possible mutagenic hazards of some food additives, beverages and insecticides (1968, with Karl Sax)
- Radiomimetic effects on Veratrum (1968, with Karl Sax and Wayne Binns)
- Effects of sonic energy on chromosomes (1970, with Karl Sax and W.B. Itturian)

== Honors ==
In 1966, she and Karl were co-recipients of the Mary Soper Pope Memorial Award in botany. Karl crossed the Japanese cherry Prunus subhirtella with Prunus apetela and named the resulting hybrid Prunus Hally Jolivette in her honor.
