= Mary Soper Pope Memorial Award =

The Mary Soper Pope Memorial Award, informally known as the Mary Soper Pope Medal, was awarded by the Cranbrook Institute of Science of Detroit, Michigan, for notable achievement in plant sciences. It was inaugurated in 1946, and the last award was in 1970. The medal itself was designed by sculptor Marshall Fredericks.

== Recipients ==
- 1946 Frans Verdoorn
- 1947 Charles C. Deam
- 1948 William Vogt
- 1949 Jens Christian Clausen, David D. Keck, and William Hiesey
- 1950 David D. Keck
- 1951 Martín Cárdenas
- 1952 Emma Lucy Braun
- 1954 Irving Widmer Bailey
- 1959 Kenneth Neatby
- 1962 Edmund H. Fulling
- 1964 Edgar T. Wherry
- 1966 Hally Jolivette Sax and Karl Sax
- 1969 Stanley A. Cain
- 1970 William Campbell Steere

== See also ==
- List of biology awards
