= Canadian Headache Society =

Canadian healthcare organization

The Canadian Headache Society (CHS) is an organization of health care professionals in Canada devoted to headache care, research and education. CHS makes recommendations for the diagnostic criteria as well as guidelines for the nonpharmacologic and pharmacological management of migraine headache in clinical practice. Headache Network Canada – a Canadian registered charity – and CHS maintain an educational website in joint partnership on the subject of headache disorders; both for the general public and health care professionals.
