= Pfizer =

American multinational pharmaceutical and biotechnology corporation

Pfizer Inc.
- Logo used since 2021
- Type: Public
- Traded as: NYSE: PFE; S&P 100 component; S&P 500 component
- Industry: Pharmaceutical; Biotechnology
- Founded: 1849; 177 years ago in New York City
- Founders: Charles Pfizer; Charles F. Erhart
- Headquarters: The Spiral, New York City, US; 40°45′19″N 73°59′59″W
- Area served: Worldwide
- Key people: Albert Bourla (Chairman and CEO)
- Products: Pharmaceutical drugs; vaccines
- Revenue: ▼US$62.58 billion (2025)
- Operating income: ▲US$14.24 billion (2025)
- Net income: ▼US$7.771 billion (2025)
- Total assets: ▼US$208.2 billion (2025)
- Total equity: ▼US$86.48 billion (2025)
- Number of employees: c. 75,000 (2025)
- Website: www.pfizer.com

Former corporate logos (until 2021).

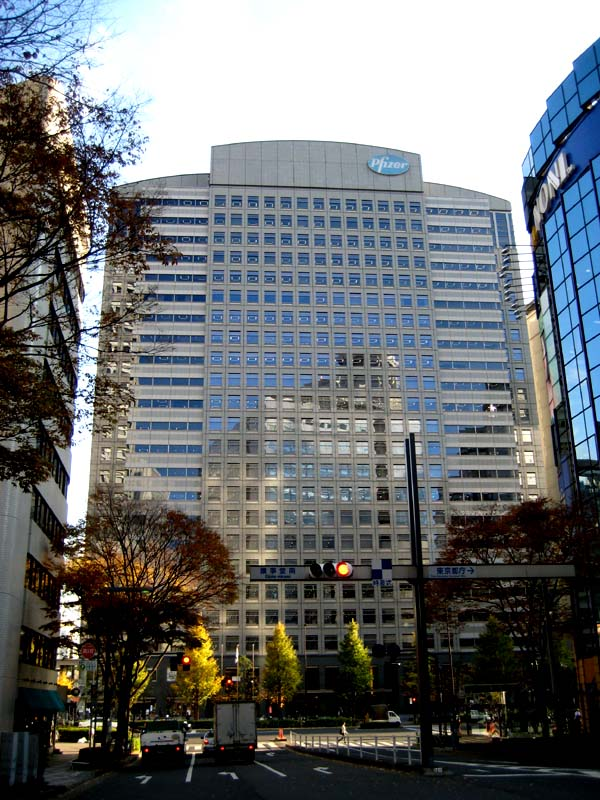
The headquarters of Pfizer in Tokyo, Japan

Pfizer Inc. (/ˈfaɪzər/ FY-zər) is an American multinational pharmaceutical and biotechnology corporation headquartered at The Spiral in Manhattan, New York City. Founded in 1849 in New York by German entrepreneurs Charles Pfizer and Charles F. Erhart, Pfizer is one of the oldest pharmaceutical companies in North America.

Pfizer develops and produces medication and vaccines for immunology, oncology, cardiology, endocrinology, and neurology. The company's largest products by sales are Eliquis (apixaban) ($7.9 billion in 2025 revenues, 13% of total revenues), Prevnar (a pneumococcal conjugate vaccine) ($6.5 billion in 2025 revenues, 10% of total revenues), Paxlovid (Nirmatrelvir/ritonavir) ($2.4 billion in 2025 revenues, 4% of total revenues), Vyndaqel (tafamidis) ($6.4 billion in 2025 revenues, 10% of total revenues), Comirnaty (the Pfizer–BioNTech COVID-19 vaccine) ($4.4 billion in 2025 revenues, 7% of total revenues), and Ibrance (palbociclib) ($4.1 billion in 2025 revenues, 7% of total revenues). In 2025, 59% of the company's revenues came from the United States, 5% came from China, and 36% came from other countries.

The company is ranked fifth on the list of largest biomedical companies by revenue. It is ranked the 69th on the Fortune 500 and 73rd on the Forbes Global 2000.

== History ==
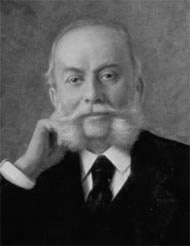
Charles Pfizer (1824–1906)

=== 1849–1950: Early history ===
Pfizer was founded in 1849 as Charles Pfizer & Company by Charles Pfizer and Charles F. Erhart, two cousins who had immigrated to the United States from Ludwigsburg, Germany. The business produced chemical compounds, and was headquartered on Bartlett Street in Williamsburg, Brooklyn, where it produced an antiparasitic called santonin. This was an immediate success, although it was production of citric acid that led to Pfizer's growth in the 1880s. Pfizer continued to buy property in the area (by now the Williamsburg district of the city of Brooklyn, New York and beginning in 1898, the City of Greater New York) to expand its lab and factory, retaining offices on Flushing Avenue until the 1960s; the Brooklyn plant ultimately closed in 2009. Following its success with citric acid, Pfizer (at the now-demolished 295 Washington Avenue) and Erhart (at 280 Washington Avenue) established their main residences in the nearby Clinton Hill district, known for its concentration of Gilded Age wealth.

In 1881, Pfizer moved its administrative headquarters to 81 Maiden Lane in Manhattan, presaging the company's expansion to Chicago, Illinois, a year later. By 1906 sales exceeded $3 million.

World War I caused a shortage of calcium citrate. Pfizer imported the compound from Italy for the manufacture of citric acid, and due to the disruption in supply, the company began a search for an alternative. They found this in the form of a fungus capable of fermenting sugar to citric acid. By 1919, the company was able to commercialize production of citric acid from this source. The company developed expertise in fermentation technology as a result. These skills were applied to the deep-submergence mass production of penicillin, an antibiotic, during World War II in response to the need to treat injured Allied soldiers. The company also embarked on a global soil collection program related to improving production yields of penicillin which ultimately resulted in 135,000 samples.

On June 2, 1942, the company incorporated under the Delaware General Corporation Law.

=== 1950–1980: Pivot to pharmaceutical research and global expansion ===
Due to price declines for penicillin, Pfizer searched for new antibiotics with greater profit potential. Pfizer discovered oxytetracycline in 1950, and this changed the company from a manufacturer of fine chemicals to a research-based pharmaceutical company. Pfizer developed a drug discovery program focused on in vitro synthesis to augment its research in fermentation technology. In 1959, the company established an animal health division with a 700-acre (280 ha) farm and research facility in Terre Haute, Indiana.

By the 1950s, Pfizer had established offices in Belgium, Brazil, Canada, Cuba, Mexico, Panama, Puerto Rico, and the United Kingdom. In 1960, the company moved its medical research laboratory operations out of New York City to a new facility in Groton, Connecticut. In 1980, Pfizer launched Feldene (piroxicam), a prescription anti-inflammatory medication that became Pfizer's first product to reach $1 billion in revenue.

In 1965, John Powers, Jr. became chief executive officer (CEO) of the company, succeeding John McKeen.

As the area surrounding its Brooklyn, NY plant fell into decline in the 1970s and 1980s, the company formed a public-private partnership with New York City that encompassed the construction of low- and middle-income housing, the refurbishment of apartment buildings for the homeless and the establishment of a charter school.

In 1972, Edmund T. Pratt Jr. became CEO of the company, succeeding John Powers, Jr.

=== 1980–2000: Development of Viagra, Zoloft, and Lipitor ===
In 1981, the company received approval for Diflucan (fluconazole), the first oral treatment for severe fungal infections including candidiasis, blastomycosis, coccidiodomycosis, cryptococcosis, histoplasmosis, dermatophytosis, and pityriasis versicolor.

In 1986, Pfizer acquired the worldwide rights to Zithromax (azithromycin), a macrolide antibiotic that is recommended by the Infectious Disease Society of America as a first line treatment for certain cases of community-acquired pneumonia, from Pliva.

In 1989, Pfizer scientists Peter Dunn and Albert Wood created Viagra (sildenafil) for treating high blood pressure and angina, a chest pain associated with coronary artery disease. In 1991, it was patented in the United Kingdom as a heart medication. Early trials for the medication showed that it did not work for the treatment of heart disease, but volunteers in the clinical trials had increased erections several days after taking the drug. It was patented in the United States in 1996 and received approval by the Food and Drug Administration in March 1998. In December 1998, Pfizer hired Bob Dole as a spokesperson for the drug. The patents for Viagra expired in 2020.

In 1991, William C. Steere, Jr. became CEO, succeeding Edmund T. Pratt Jr.

In 1991 Pfizer also began marketing Zoloft (sertraline), an antidepressant of the selective serotonin reuptake inhibitor (SSRI) class developed nine years earlier by Pfizer chemists Kenneth Koe and Willard Welch. Sertraline is primarily prescribed for major depressive disorder in adult outpatients as well as obsessive-compulsive disorder, panic disorder, and social anxiety disorder in both adults and children. In 2005, the year before it became a generic drug, sales were over $3 billion and over 100 million people had been treated with the drug. The patent for Zoloft expired in the summer of 2006.

In 1996, Eisai, in partnership with Pfizer, received approval from the Food and Drug Administration for donepezil under the brand Aricept for treatment of Alzheimer's disease; Pfizer also received approval for Norvasc (amlodipine), an antihypertensive drug of the dihydropyridine calcium channel blocker class.

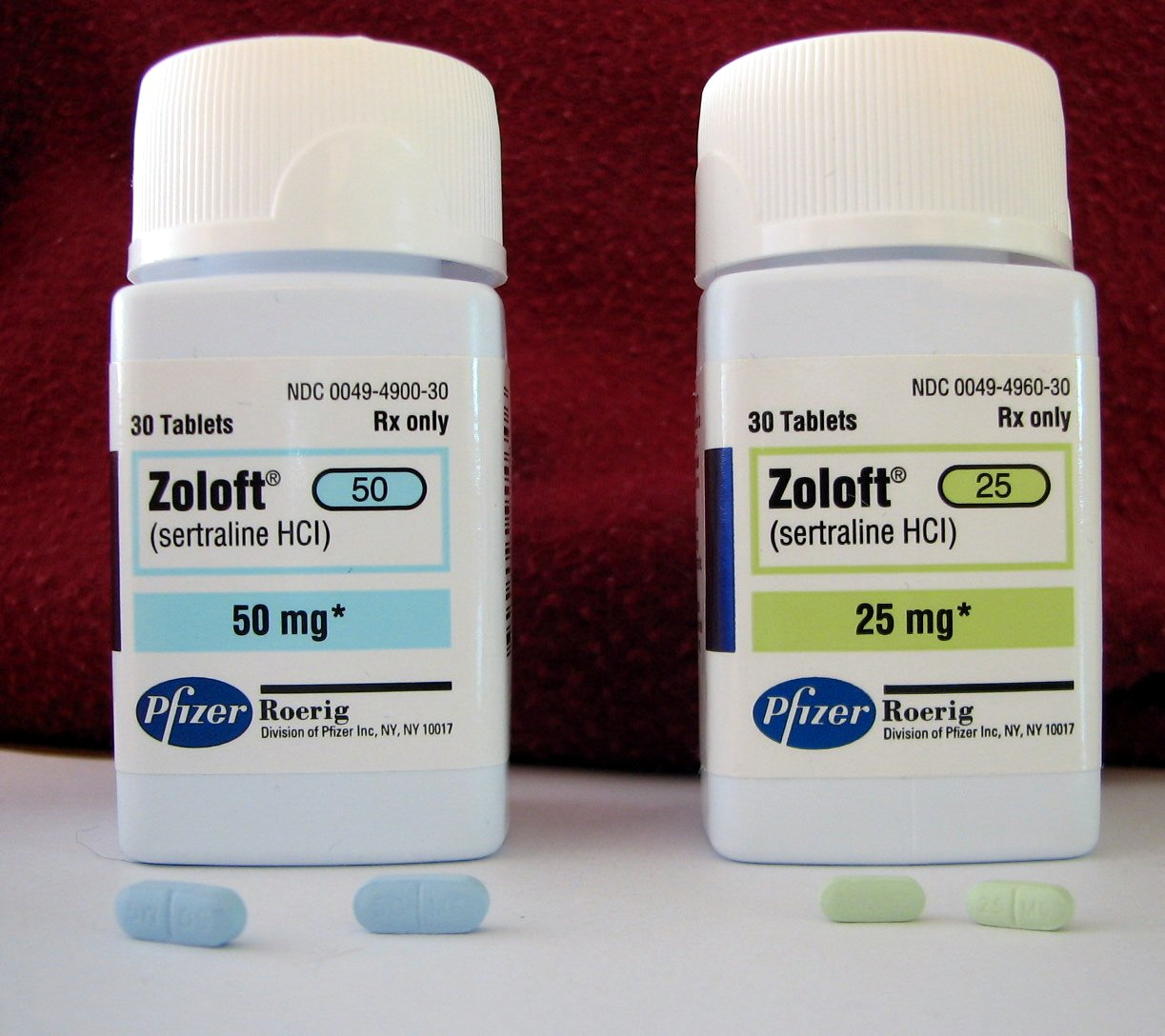
Bottles of Zoloft (sertraline), an antidepressant

In 1997, the company entered into a co-marketing agreement with Warner–Lambert for Lipitor (atorvastatin), a statin for the treatment of hypercholesterolemia. Although atorvastatin was the fifth statin to be developed, clinical trials showed that atorvastatin caused a more dramatic reduction in low-density lipoprotein pattern C (LDL-C) than the other statin drugs. Upon its patent expiration in 2011, Lipitor was the best-selling drug ever, with approximately $125 billion in sales over 14.5 years.

=== 2000–2010: Further expansion ===
In 2001, Henry McKinnell became CEO, replacing William C. Steere, Jr.

In 2002, The Bill & Melinda Gates Foundation purchased stock in Pfizer.

In 2004, the company received approval for Lyrica (pregabalin), an anticonvulsant and anxiolytic medication used to treat epilepsy, neuropathic pain, fibromyalgia, restless leg syndrome, and generalized anxiety disorder. The United States patent on Lyrica was challenged by generic manufacturers and was upheld in 2014, extending the expiration date to 2018.

In July 2006, Jeff Kindler was named CEO, replacing Henry McKinnell.

On December 3, 2006, Pfizer ceased development of torcetrapib, a drug that increases production of HDL, which reduces LDL thought to be correlated to heart disease. During a Phase III clinical trial involving 15,000 patients, more deaths than expected occurred in the group that took the medicine, and the mortality rate of patients taking the combination of torcetrapib and Lipitor (82 deaths during the study) was 60% higher than those taking Lipitor alone (52 deaths during the study). Lipitor alone was not implicated in the results, but Pfizer lost nearly $1 billion developing the failed drug and its stock price dropped 11% on the day of the announcement.

Between 2007 and 2010, Pfizer spent $3.3 million on investigations and legal fees and recovered about $5.1 million, and had another $5 million of pending recoveries from civil lawsuits against makers of counterfeit prescription drugs. Pfizer has hired customs and narcotics experts worldwide to track down fakes and assemble evidence that can be used to pursue civil suits for trademark infringement.

In July 2008, Pfizer announced 275 job cuts at its manufacturing facility in Portage, Michigan. Portage was previously the world headquarters of Upjohn Company, which had been acquired as part of Pharmacia.

==== Acquisitions and mergers ====
In June 2000, Pfizer acquired Warner-Lambert outright for $116 billion. To satisfy conditions imposed by antitrust regulators at the Federal Trade Commission, Pfizer sold off or transferred stakes in several minor products, including RID (a shampoo for treatment of head lice, sold to Bayer) and Warner-Lambert's antidepressant Celexa (which competes with Zoloft). The acquisition created what was, at the time, the second-largest pharmaceutical company worldwide.

In 2003, Pfizer merged with Pharmacia, and in the process acquired Searle and SUGEN. Searle had developed Flagyl (metronidazole), a nitroimidazole antibiotic medication used particularly for anaerobic bacteria and protozoa. Searle also developed celecoxib (Celebrex) a COX-2 inhibitor and nonsteroidal anti-inflammatory drug (NSAID) used to treat the pain and inflammation in osteoarthritis, acute pain in adults, rheumatoid arthritis, ankylosing spondylitis, painful menstruation, and juvenile rheumatoid arthritis. SUGEN, a company focused on protein kinase inhibitors, had pioneered the use of ATP-mimetic small molecules to block signal transduction. The SUGEN facility was shut down in 2003 by Pfizer, with the loss of more than 300 jobs, and several programs were transferred to Pfizer. These included sunitinib (Sutent), a cancer medication which was approved for human use by the FDA in January 2006. A related compound, SU11654 (Toceranib), was also approved for cancer in dogs, and the ALK inhibitor Crizotinib also grew out of a SUGEN program.

In October 2006, the company announced it would acquire PowerMed.

On October 15, 2009, Pfizer acquired Wyeth for $68 billion in cash and stock, including the assumption of debt, making Pfizer the largest pharmaceutical company in the world. The acquisition of Wyeth provided Pfizer with a pneumococcal conjugate vaccine, trademarked Prevnar 13; this is used for the prevention of invasive pneumococcal infections. The introduction of the original, 7-valent version of the vaccine, developed by Wyeth in February 2000, led to a 75% reduction in the incidence of invasive pneumococcal infections among children under age 5 in the United States. Pfizer introduced an improved version of the vaccine in 2010, for which it was granted a patent in India in 2017. Prevnar 13 provides coverage of 13 bacterial variants, expanding beyond the original 7-valent version. By 2012, the rate of invasive infections among children under age 5 had been reduced by an additional 50%.

=== 2010–2020: Further discoveries and acquisitions ===
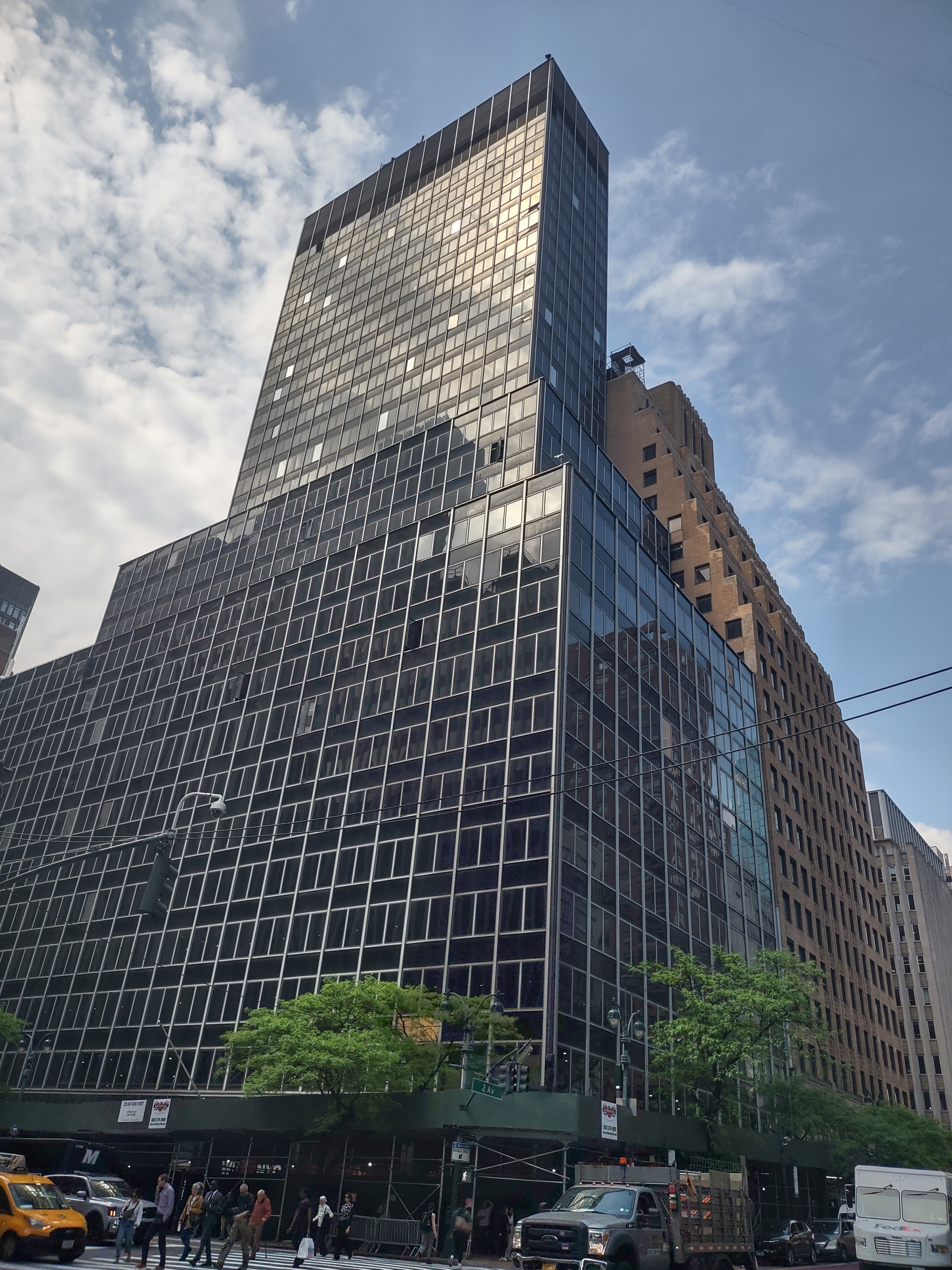
The Pfizer Building, the former headquarters on 42nd Street

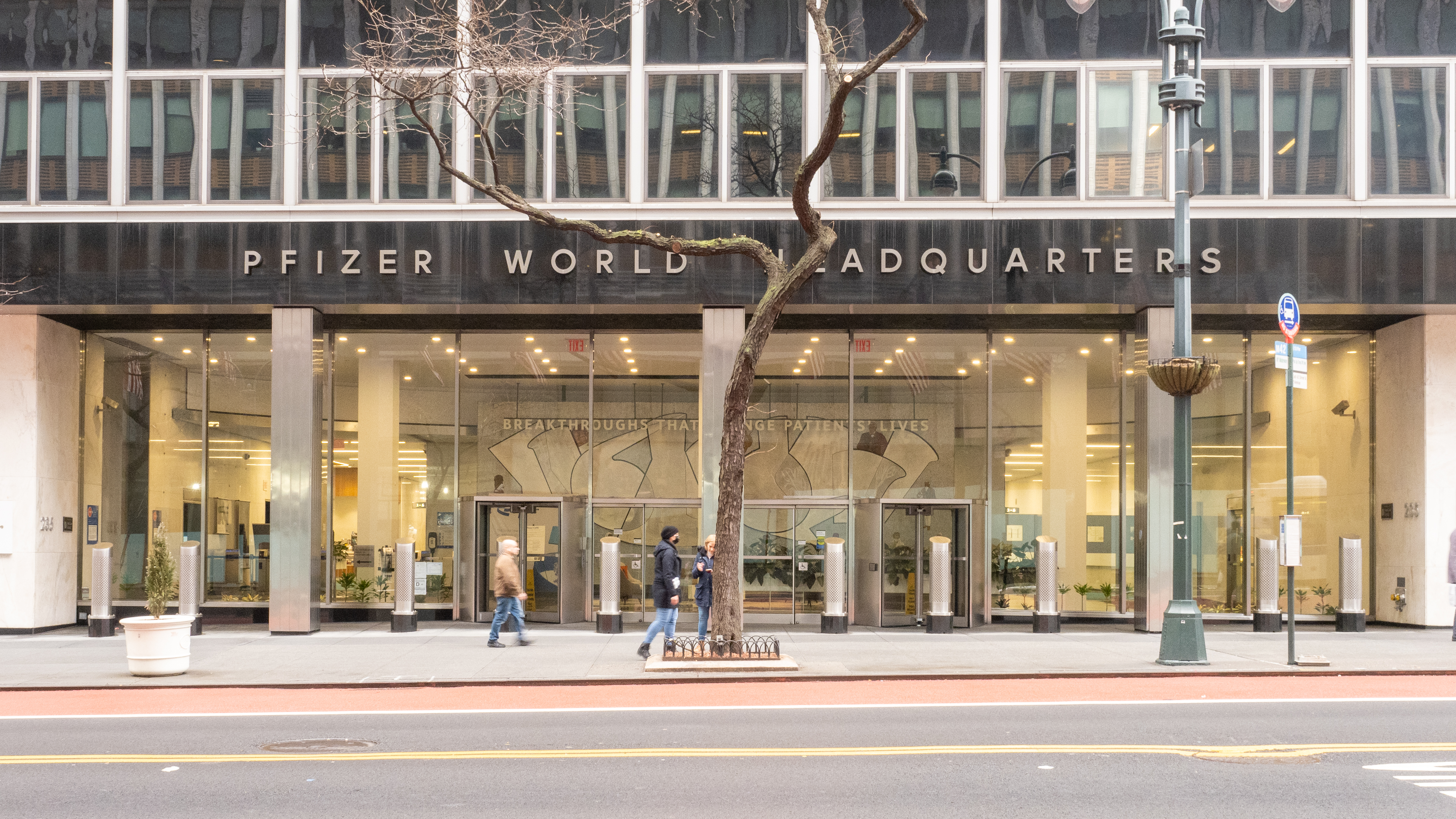
Entrance to former Pfizer World Headquarters building (1961–2023)

In 2010, Ian Read was named CEO.

In February 2011, Pfizer announced the closure of its UK research and development facility (formerly also a manufacturing plant) in Sandwich, Kent, which at the time employed 2,400 people. In March 2011, Pfizer acquired King Pharmaceuticals for $3.6 billion in cash. King produced emergency injectables such as the EpiPen.

On September 4, 2012, the FDA approved bosutinib (Bosulif) for chronic myelogenous leukemia (CML), a rare type of leukemia and a blood and bone marrow disease that affects primarily older adults. In November 2012, Pfizer received approval from the Food and Drug Administration for Xeljanz, a tofacitinib, for rheumatoid arthritis and ulcerative colitis. The drug had sales of $1.77 billion in 2018, and in January 2019, it was the top drug in the United States for direct-to-consumer advertising, passing adalimumab (Humira). In 2023, the Institute for Clinical and Economic Review (ICER) identified Xeljanz (tofacitinib) as one of five high-expenditure drugs that experienced significant net price increases without new clinical evidence to justify the hikes. Specifically, Xeljanz's wholesale acquisition cost rose by 6%, leading to an additional $72 million in costs to U.S. payers.

On February 1, 2013, Zoetis, the Agriculture Division of Pfizer and later Pfizer Animal Health, became a public company via an initial public offering, raising $2.2 billion. Later in 2013, Pfizer completed the corporate spin-off of its remaining stake in Zoetis.

In September 2014, the company acquired Innopharma for $225 million, plus up to $135 million in milestone payments, in a deal that expanded Pfizer's range of generic and injectable drugs.

On January 5, 2015, the company announced it would acquire a controlling interest in Redvax, expanding its vaccine portfolio targeting human cytomegalovirus. In February 2015, the company received approval from the Food and Drug Administration for palbociclib (Ibrance) for treatment of certain types of breast cancer. In March 2015, the company announced it would restart its collaboration with Eli Lilly and Company surrounding the Phase III trial of Tanezumab. In May 2015, Pfizer and a Bar-Ilan University laboratory announced a partnership based on the development of medical DNA nanotechnology. In June 2015, the company acquired Nimenrix and Mencevax, meningococcal vaccines, from GlaxoSmithKline for around $130 million. In September 2015, Pfizer acquired Hospira for $17 billion, including the assumption of debt. Hospira was the largest producer of generic injectable pharmaceuticals in the world. On November 23, 2015, Pfizer and Allergan announced a planned $160 billion merger, in the largest pharmaceutical deal ever and the third largest corporate merger in history. The proposed transaction contemplated that the merged company maintain Allergan's Republic of Ireland domicile, resulting in the new company being subject to corporation tax at the relatively low rate of 12.5%. The deal was to constitute a reverse merger, whereby Allergan acquired Pfizer, with the new company then changing its name to "Pfizer, plc". On April 6, 2016, Pfizer and Allergan terminated the merger agreement after the Obama administration and the United States Department of the Treasury introduced new laws intended to limit corporate inversions (the extent to which companies could move their headquarters overseas in order to reduce the amount of taxes they pay).

In June 2016, the company acquired Anacor Pharmaceuticals for $5.2 billion, expanding its portfolio in both inflammation and immunology drugs areas. In August 2016, the company made a $40 million bid for the assets of BIND Therapeutics, which was in bankruptcy. The same month, the company acquired Bamboo Therapeutics for $645 million, expanding its gene therapy offerings. In September 2016, the company acquired cancer drug-maker Medivation for $14 billion. In October 2016, the company licensed the anti-CTLA4 monoclonal antibody, ONC-392, from OncoImmune. In November 2016, Pfizer funded a $3,435,600 study with the CDC Foundation to research "screen-and-treat" strategies for cryptococcal disease in Botswana. In December 2016, Pfizer acquired AstraZeneca's small-molecule antibiotics business for $1.575 billion.

In January 2018, Pfizer announced that it would end its work on research into treatments for Alzheimer's disease and Parkinsonism (a symptom of Parkinson's disease and other conditions). The company said about 300 researchers would lose their jobs. In July 2018, the Food and Drug Administration approved enzalutamide, developed by Pfizer and Astellas Pharma for patients with castration-resistant prostate cancer. In August 2018, Pfizer signed an agreement with BioNTech to conduct joint research and development activities regarding mRNA-based influenza vaccines. In October 2018, effective January 1, 2019, Albert Bourla was promoted to CEO, succeeding Ian Read, his mentor. In July 2019, the company acquired Therachon for up to $810 million, expanding its rare disease portfolio through Therachon's recombinant human fibroblast growth factor receptor 3 compound, aimed at treating conditions such as achondroplasia. Also in July, Pfizer acquired Array Biopharma for $10.6 billion, boosting its oncology pipeline. In August 2019, Pfizer merged its consumer health business with that of GlaxoSmithKline, into a joint venture owned 68% by GlaxoSmithKline and 32% by Pfizer, with plans to make it a public company. The transaction built on a 2018 transaction where GlaxoSmithKline acquired Novartis' stake in the GSK-Novartis consumer healthcare joint business. The transaction followed negotiations with other companies including Reckitt Benckiser, Sanofi, Johnson & Johnson, and Procter & Gamble. In September 2019, Pfizer initiated a study with the CDC Foundation to investigate the tracking of healthcare-associated infections, scheduled to run through to June 2023. In December 2019, Pfizer awarded the CDC Foundation a further $1,948,482 to continue its cryptococcal disease screening and treatment research in nine African countries.

=== 2020–present: pandemic, corporate development, and Trump tariffs ===
==== COVID-19 and vaccine development ====
In March 2020, Pfizer joined the COVID-19 Therapeutics Accelerator funding vehicle to expedite development of treatments against COVID-19. The $125 million initiative was launched by the Bill & Melinda Gates Foundation in partnership with Mastercard and Wellcome Trust, with additional funding announced shortly after from Chan Zuckerberg Initiative, UK Foreign, Commonwealth and Development Office and Madonna.

The following month, the Foundation for the National Institutes of Health announced the Accelerating COVID-19 Therapeutic Interventions and Vaccines (ACTIV) public-private partnership to develop a coordinated research strategy for prioritizing and speeding up development of COVID-19 vaccines and pharmaceutical products. Pfizer joined the partnership as an industry "leadership organization", and participated as a collaborator in ACTIV-led clinical trials. CEO Albert Bourla attended the GAVI COVAX AMC 2021 Investment Opportunity Launch Event, otherwise named One World Protected, on April 15, 2021.

In Canada, Pfizer endorsed the use of a vaccine passport mobile app developed by CANImmunize in order to record and track status of COVID-19 vaccination.

As the scale of the COVID-19 pandemic became apparent, Pfizer partnered with BioNTech to study and develop COVID-19 mRNA vaccine candidates. Unlike many of its competitors, Pfizer took no initial research funds from the United States' Operation Warp Speed vaccine development program, instead choosing to invest roughly $2 billion of its own funds. Pfizer CEO Albert Bourla has said that he declined money from Operation Warp Speed to avoid government intervention, stating later that "when you get money from someone that always comes with strings. They want to see how we are going to progress, what type of moves you are going to do. They want reports. And also, I wanted to keep Pfizer out of politics, by the way."

In May 2020, Pfizer began testing four different COVID-19 vaccine variations using lipid nanoparticle technology provided by Canadian biotechnology company Acuitas Therapeutics. Vaccines were injected into the first human participants in the U.S. in early May. In July 2020, Pfizer and BioNTech announced that two of the partners' four mRNA vaccine candidates had won fast track designation from the FDA. The company began Phase II-III testing on 30,000 people in the last week of July 2020 and was slated to be paid $1.95 billion for 100 million doses of the vaccine by the US government. In September 2020, Pfizer and BioNTech announced that they had completed talks with the European Commission to provide an initial 200 million vaccine doses to the EU, with the option to supply another 100 million doses at a later date.

On November 9, 2020, Pfizer announced that BioNTech's COVID-19 vaccine, tested on 43,500 people, was found to be 90% effective at preventing symptomatic COVID-19. The efficacy was updated to 95% a week later, described as a "really a spectacular number" and made Pfizer and BioNTech the first companies to develop and test a working vaccine for COVID-19.

In November and December 2020, regulators in various countries approved Pfizer's vaccine for emergency use.

==== Development of oral antivirals ====
In November 2021, Pfizer launched a new COVID-19 oral antivirus treatment known as Paxlovid. In January 2022, the Pfizer CEO Albert Bourla confirmed that the trial results of a fourth dose were pending until March 2022. He said that the firm was setting up a collaboration to develop an anti-COVID pill treatment along with a French company, Novasep. He also said the COVID vaccine was "safe and efficient" for children. In May 2022, reports emerged of patients experiencing "rebound" symptoms after completing a five-day course of Paxlovid. The FDA responded by announcing they had performed additional analyses of the drug's clinical trial data, and decided against changing its recommendations. U.S. President Joe Biden and Dr. Anthony Fauci were both reported to experience this rebound syndrome in the months that followed, while continuing to recommend the drug for those who may benefit from it.

==== Corporate developments and acquisitions ====
In September 2020, the company acquired a 9.9% stake in CStone Pharmaceuticals for $200 million (HK$1.55 billion), helping to commercialise its anti-PD-L1 monoclonal antibody, CS1001. In October 2020, the company acquired Arixa Pharmaceuticals. In November 2020, using a Reverse Morris Trust structure, Pfizer merged its off-patent branded and generic drug business, known as Upjohn, with Mylan to form Viatris, owned 57% by Pfizer shareholders.

On January 5, 2021, Pfizer introduced a new logo. In April 2021, Pfizer acquired Amplyx Pharmaceuticals and its anti-fungal compound fosmanogepix (APX001). In August, the company announced it would acquire Trillium Therapeutics Inc and its immuno-oncology portfolio for $2.3 billion.

In November 2021, gene therapy research was delayed by trial changes.

In March 2022, the company acquired Arena Pharmaceuticals for $6.7 billion in cash. In June 2022, the company acquired ReViral Ltd, for up to $525 million, gaining access to experimental drugs used to combat respiratory syncytial virus infections. In October 2022, the company acquired Biohaven Pharma and its calcitonin gene-related peptide programs for $11.6 billion. It also acquired Global Blood Therapeutics for $5.4 billion, boosting Pfizer's rare disease business.

In April 2023, Pfizer moved its world headquarters from 42nd Street in Midtown Manhattan to the Spiral at Hudson Yards.

In September 2023, CDC Endorsed Pfizer's Maternal RSV Vaccine to Shield Newborns.

In October 2023, the EMBARK trial showed improved metastasis-free survival in high-risk, non-metastatic prostate cancer patients, leading to the FDA approval of a combination therapy in 2023.

In December 2023, the company acquired Seagen, a pioneer of antibody–drug conjugates for the treatment of cancer, for $43 billion.

In December 2023, the EV-302 study investigated new treatments for advanced urothelial cancer, focusing on improving care for hard-to-treat patient groups.

In January 2024, omnichannel strategies were being used to provide tailored healthcare solutions for patients and professionals.

In February 2024, Saama and Pfizer reached an expanded multi-year agreement to integrate AI-driven solutions across Pfizer's R&D portfolio, building on their 2020 partnership. Initially the partnership focused on automating data review processes with the Smart Data Quality (SDQ) platform – developed during Pfizer's COVID-19 vaccine trials – the partnership as of 2024 scales to streamline data review and accelerate regulatory submissions across global studies. The expanded collaboration introduces Saama's Biometrics Research and Analysis Information Network, enabling faster statistical programming, biostatistics workflows, and submission-ready outputs.

In February 2024, Pfizer reported durable second-season efficacy for RSV vaccine.

In June 2024, Pfizer announced a collaboration with the Abu Dhabi Department of Health to analyze real-world data on Sickle Cell Disease using AI.

In July 2024, Lyme Disease Vaccine Reached Completion of the Primary Series

In July 2024, Pfizer and Flagship Pioneering announced an "Innovation Supply Chain" partnership to co-develop 10 drug candidates. Each party committed $50 million upfront, leveraging Flagship's ecosystem of over 40 startups to align with Pfizer's priorities. Pfizer will fund the selected programs and has the option to license or acquire assets, with potential success milestones and royalties reaching up to $700 million per commercialized drug. Two programs, focused on obesity and cardiovascular diseases, have already been initiated.

In July 2024, Pfizer advanced its obesity treatment research through the development of danuglipron, an oral glucagon-like peptide-1 (GLP-1) receptor agonist:

In August 2024, Pfizer introduced PfizerForAll, a digital platform designed to streamline access to healthcare and wellness resources in the United States.

In October 2024, Pfizer announced positive results from phase 3 TALAPRO-2 trial of Talzenna in combination with Xtandi in patients with mCRPC.

In October 2024, Pfizer announced a partnership with the Ignition AI Accelerator, a collaborative initiative by Nvidia, Tribe, and Digital Industry Singapore (DISG). The collaboration aims using artificial intelligence to expedite drug discovery and development processes, improve operational efficiency, and streamline stakeholder engagement. The initiative also focuses on optimizing manufacturing processes, including improving yields and reducing cycle times.

In March 2025, the company sold its entire stake in Haleon for $3.24 billion to institutional investors.

In October 2025, Pfizer entered an agreement with the Trump administration to voluntarily lower US drug prices, which included a three-year exemption from pharmaceutical-specific tariffs, as long as the firm further invests in domestic manufacturing. Pfizer pledged to put $70 billion into US manufacturing and research.

In November 2025, Pfizer acquired Metsera to expand its weight-loss drug portfolio in a deal that had the potential to exceed $10 billion.

== Acquisitions ==
Pfizer acquisitions
- Pfizer (Founded 1849 as Charles Pfizer & Company)
  - Warner–Lambert (Acq 2000)
    - William R. Warner (Founded 1856, merged 1955)
    - Lambert Pharmacal Company (Merged 1955)
    - Parke-Davis (Founded 1860, Acq 1976)
    - Wilkinson Sword (Acq 1993, divested 2003)
    - Agouron (Acq 1999)
  - Pharmacia (Acq 2002)
    - Pharmacia & Upjohn (Merged 2000)
      - Pharmacia (Merged 1995)
        - Farmitalia Carlo Erba
        - Kabi Pharmacia
        - Pharmacia Aktiebolaget
      - The Upjohn Company (Merged 1995)
      - Monsanto (Merged 2000, divested 2002)
      - Searle (Merged 2000)
  - Esperion Therapeutics (Acq 2003, divested 2008)
  - Meridica (Acq 2004)
  - Vicuron Pharmaceuticals (Acq 2005)
  - Idun (Acq 2005)
  - Angiosyn (Acq 2005)
  - Powermed (Acq 2006)
  - Rinat (Acq 2006)
  - Coley Pharmaceutical Group (Acq 2007)
  - CovX (Acq 2007)
  - Encysive Pharmaceuticals Inc (Acq 2008)
  - Wyeth (Acq 2009)
    - Chef Boyardee (Acq 1946, divested 1996 with food div)
    - S.M.A. Corporation
    - Ayerst Laboratories (Acq 1943)
    - Fort Dodge Serum Company (Acq 1945)
    - Bristol-Myers (Animal Health div)
    - Parke-Davis (Animal Health div)
    - A.H. Robins
    - Sherwood Medical (Acq 1982)
    - Genetics Institute, Inc. (Acq 1992)
    - American Cyanamid (Acq 1994)
    - Lederle Laboratories
    - Solvay (Acq 1995, Animal Health div)
  - King Pharmaceuticals (Acq 2010)
    - Monarch Pharmaceuticals, Inc.
    - King Pharmaceuticals Research and Development, Inc.
    - Meridian Medical Technologies, Inc.
    - Parkedale Pharmaceuticals, Inc.
    - King Pharmaceuticals Canada Inc.
    - Monarch Pharmaceuticals Ireland Limited
  - Synbiotics Corporation (Acq 2011)
  - Icagen (Acq 2011)
  - Ferrosan (Consumer Health div, Acq 2011)
  - Excaliard Pharmaceuticals (Acq 2011)
  - Alacer Corp (Acq 2012)
  - NextWave Pharmaceuticals, Inc (Acq 2012)
  - Innopharma (Acq 2014)
  - Redvax GmbH (Acq 2014)
  - Hospira (Spun off from Abbott Laboratories 2004, Acq 2015)
    - Mayne Pharma Ltd (Acq 2007)
    - Pliva-Croatia
    - Orchid Chemicals & Pharmaceuticals Ltd. (Generics & Injectables div, Acq 2009)
    - Javelin Pharmaceuticals, Inc. (Acq 2010)
    - TheraDoc (Acq 2010)
    - Arixa Pharmaceuticals (Acq 2020)
  - Anacor Pharmaceuticals(Acq 2016)
  - Bamboo Therapeutics (Acq 2016)
  - Medivation (Acq 2016)
  - AstraZeneca (Small molecule antibiotic div, Acq 2016)
  - Array BioPharma (Acq 2019)
  - Amplyx Pharmaceuticals (Acq 2021)
  - Trillium Therapeutics (Acq 2021)
  - Arena Pharmaceuticals (Acq 2022)
  - ReViral Ltd (Acq 2022)
  - Biohaven Pharma (Acq 2022)
    - Kleo Pharmaceuticals, Inc. (Acq 2021)
  - Seagen (Acq 2023)
    - Cascadian Therapeutics (Acq 2018)
  - Metsera (Acq 2025)

== Legal issues ==
=== Aggressive pharmaceutical marketing ===
Pfizer has been accused of aggressive pharmaceutical marketing.

==== Illegal marketing of gabapentin for off-label uses settlement (2004) ====
In 1993, the Food and Drug Administration (FDA) approved gabapentin only for treatment of seizures. Warner–Lambert, which merged with Pfizer in 2000, used continuing medical education and medical research, sponsored articles about the drug for the medical literature, and alleged suppression of unfavorable study results, to promote gabapentin. Within five years, the drug was being widely used for off-label uses such as treatment of pain and psychiatric conditions. Warner–Lambert admitted to violating FDA regulations by promoting the drug for pain, psychiatric conditions, migraine, and other unapproved uses. In 2004, the company paid $430 million in one of the largest settlements to resolve criminal and civil health care liability charges. It was the first off-label promotion case successfully brought under the False Claims Act. A Cochrane review concluded that gabapentin is ineffective in migraine prophylaxis. The American Academy of Neurology rates it as having unproven efficacy, while the Canadian Headache Society and the European Federation of Neurological Societies rate its use as being supported by moderate and low-quality evidence.

==== Illegal marketing of Bextra settlement (2009) ====
In September 2009, Pfizer pleaded guilty to the illegal marketing of arthritis drug valdecoxib (Bextra) and agreed to a $2.3 billion settlement, the largest health care fraud settlement at that time. Pfizer promoted the sale of the drug for several uses and dosages that the Food and Drug Administration specifically declined to approve due to safety concerns. The drug was pulled from the market in 2005. It was Pfizer's fourth such settlement in a decade. The payment included $1.195 billion in criminal penalties for felony violations of the Federal Food, Drug, and Cosmetic Act, and $1.0 billion to settle allegations it had illegally promoted the drugs for uses that were not approved by the FDA leading to violations under the False Claims Act as reimbursements were requested from Federal and State programs. The criminal fine was the largest ever assessed in the United States to date. Pfizer entered a corporate integrity agreement with the Office of Inspector General that required it to make substantial structural reforms within the company, and publish to its website its post approval commitments and a searchable database of all payments to physicians made by the company.

==== Termination of Peter Rost (2005) ====
Peter Rost was vice president in charge of the endocrinology division at Pharmacia before its acquisition by Pfizer. During that time he raised concerns internally about kickbacks and off-label marketing of Genotropin, Pharmacia's human growth hormone drug. Pfizer reported the Pharmacia marketing practices to the FDA and Department of Justice; Rost was unaware of this and filed an FCA lawsuit against Pfizer. Pfizer kept him employed, but isolated him until the FCA suit was unsealed in 2005. The Justice Department declined to intervene, and Pfizer fired him, and he filed a wrongful termination suit against Pfizer. Pfizer won a summary dismissal of the case, with the court ruling that the evidence showed Pfizer had decided to fire Rost prior to learning of his whistleblower activities.

==== Illegal marketing of Rapamune settlement (2014) ====
A "whistleblower suit" was filed in 2005 against Wyeth, which was acquired by Pfizer in 2009, alleging that the company illegally marketed sirolimus (Rapamune) for off-label uses, targeted specific doctors and medical facilities to increase sales of Rapamune, tried to get transplant patients to change from their transplant drugs to Rapamune, and specifically targeted African Americans. According to the whistleblowers, Wyeth also provided doctors and hospitals that prescribed the drug with kickbacks such as grants, donations, and other money. In 2013, the company pleaded guilty to criminal mis-branding violations under the Federal Food, Drug, and Cosmetic Act. By August 2014, it had paid $491 million in civil and criminal penalties related to Rapamune.

==== Illegal marketing settlement (2014) ====
In June 2010, health insurance network Blue Cross Blue Shield (BCBS) filed a lawsuit against Pfizer for allegedly illegally marketing drugs Bextra, Geodon and Lyrica. BCBS alleged that Pfizer used kickbacks and wrongly persuaded doctors to prescribe the drugs. According to the lawsuit, Pfizer handed out 'misleading' materials on off-label uses, sent over 5,000 doctors on trips to the Caribbean or around the United States, and paid them $2,000 honoraria in return for listening to lectures about Bextra. Despite Pfizer's claims that "the company's intent was pure" in fostering a legal exchange of information among doctors, an internal marketing plan revealed that Pfizer intended to train physicians "to serve as public relations spokespeople." The case was settled in 2014 for $325 million. Fearing that Pfizer is "too big to fail" and that prosecuting the company would result in disruptions to Medicare and Medicaid, federal prosecutors instead charged a subsidiary of a subsidiary of a subsidiary of Pfizer, which is "nothing more than a shell company whose only function is to plead guilty."

=== Quigley Company asbestos settlement (2013) ===
The Quigley Company, which sold asbestos-containing insulation products until the early 1970s, was acquired by Pfizer in 1968. In June 2013, asbestos victims and Pfizer negotiated a settlement that required Pfizer to pay a total of $964 million: $430 million to 80% of existing plaintiffs and place an additional $535 million into a settlement trust that will compensate future plaintiffs as well as the remaining 20% of plaintiffs with claims against Pfizer and Quigley. Of that $535 million, $405 million is in a 40-year note from Pfizer, while $100 million is from insurance policies.

=== Shiley defective heart valves settlement (1994) ===
Pfizer purchased Shiley in 1979, at the onset of its Convexo-Concave valve ordeal, involving the Bjork–Shiley valve. Approximately 500 people died when defective heart valves fractured and, in 1994, Pfizer agreed to pay $10.75 million to settle claims by the United States Department of Justice that the company lied to get approval for the valves.

=== Firing of employee that filed suit (2010) ===
A federal lawsuit was filed by a scientist claiming she got an infection by a genetically modified lentivirus while working for Pfizer, resulting in intermittent paralysis. A judge dismissed the case citing a lack of evidence that the illness was caused by the virus but the jury ruled that by firing the employee, Pfizer violated laws protecting freedom of speech and whistleblowers and awarded her $1.37 million.

=== Celebrex intellectual property settlement (2012) ===
Brigham Young University (BYU) said a professor of chemistry, Dr. Daniel L. Simmons, discovered an enzyme in the 1990s that led towards development of Celebrex. BYU was originally seeking a 15% royalty on sales, equating to $9.7 billion. A research agreement had been made between BYU and Monsanto, whose pharmaceutical business was later acquired by Pfizer, to develop a better aspirin. The enzyme Dr. Simmons claims to have discovered would induce pain and inflammation while causing gastrointestinal problems and Celebrex is used to reduce those issues. A six-year battle ensued because BYU claimed that Pfizer did not give Dr. Simmons credit or compensation, while Pfizer claimed that it had met all obligations regarding the Monsanto agreement. In May 2012, Pfizer settled the allegations, agreeing to pay $450 million.

=== Nigeria Trovafloxacin lawsuit settlement (2011) ===
In 1996, an outbreak of measles, cholera, and bacterial meningitis occurred in Nigeria. Pfizer representatives and personnel from a contract research organization (CRO) traveled to Kano to set up a clinical trial and administer an experimental antibiotic, trovafloxacin, to approximately 200 children. Tests in animals showed that Trovan had life-threatening side effects, including joint disease, abnormal cartilage growth, liver damage, and a degenerative bone condition. Pfizer's representatives did not alert the parents or patients about the serious risks involved, or tell them about an effective conventional treatment that Doctors without Borders was providing at the same site. Local Kano officials reported that more than fifty children died in the experiment, while many others developed mental and physical deformities such as blindness, deafness, paralysis, and brain damage. The nature and frequency of both fatalities and other adverse outcomes were similar to those historically found among pediatric patients treated for meningitis in sub-Saharan Africa. In 2001, families of the children, as well as the governments of Kano and Nigeria, filed lawsuits regarding the treatment. According to Democracy Now!, "[r]esearchers did not obtain signed consent forms, and medical personnel said Pfizer did not tell parents their children were getting the experimental drug." The lawsuits also accused Pfizer of using the outbreak to perform unapproved human testing, as well as allegedly under-dosing a control group being treated with traditional antibiotics in order to skew the results of the trial in favor of Trovan. Nigerian medical personnel as well as at least one Pfizer physician said the trial was conducted without regulatory approval.

In 2007, Pfizer published a Statement of Defense letter, claiming that Trozan was safely tested in five thousand patients prior to the Nigerian children clinical trial, and mortality in the patients treated by Pfizer was lower than that observed historically in African meningitis epidemics. They claim that the effects suffered by the victims were due to meningitis and not Trovan. Pfizer states that its actions did not violate any law, as there was no law in Nigeria that requires ethical committee approval prior to conducting a clinical trial. However, the drug was never tested in children before. Pfizer claims that no unusual side effects, unrelated to meningitis, were observed after four weeks in the Nigerian children clinical study, though an investigation by The Washington Post revealed that one of the children continued to have the drug administered to them until their death despite their condition worsening, which violated ethical guidelines.

In March 2001 the license for Trovan was withdrawn in Europe, by the European Commission due to liver toxicity and some deaths.

In June 2010, the US Supreme Court rejected Pfizer's appeal against a ruling allowing lawsuits by the Nigerian families to proceed.

In December 2010, the United States diplomatic cables leak indicated that Pfizer hired investigators to find evidence of corruption against Nigerian attorney general Michael Aondoakaa to persuade him to drop legal action. The Washington Post reporter Joe Stephens, who helped break the story in 2000, called these actions "dangerously close to blackmail". In response, the company released a press statement describing the allegations as "preposterous" and saying that it acted in good faith. Aondoakka, who had allegedly demanded bribes from Pfizer in return for a settlement of the case, was declared unfit for office and had his U.S. visa revoked in association with corruption charges in 2010.

The lawsuits were eventually settled out of court. Pfizer committed to paying US$35 million "to compensate the families of children in the study", another $30 million to "support healthcare initiatives in Kano", and $10 million to cover legal costs. Payouts began in 2011.

=== Inflating prices fine (2022) ===
In July 2022, UK antitrust authorities fined Pfizer £63 million for unfairly pricing a drug that aids in controlling epileptic seizures. The Competition and Markets Authority stated that the company and Flynn took advantage of a loophole by de-branding the epilepsy drug Epanutin (phenytoin sodium capsules). This meant the price of the drug was no longer regulated and the companies could raise the price of the drug unchecked. It was stated that over a four-year period, Pfizer had billed Epanutin for around 780% and 1,600% higher than its standard price.

=== Allegations of patent infringement on mRNA technology (2022) ===
In August 2022, Moderna announced that it will sue Pfizer and its partner BioNTech for infringing its patent on the mRNA technology. In May 2024, the European Patent Office upheld the validity of Moderna's EP949 patent, one of the two patents asserted against Pfizer and BioNTech.

=== COVID-19 vaccine controversy ===
In February 2021, after a year long investigation relying on unnamed officials, Pfizer was accused by The Bureau of Investigative Journalism (TBIJ) of employing "high-level bullying" against at least two Latin American countries during negotiations to acquire COVID-19 vaccines, including requesting that the countries put sovereign assets as collateral for payments. According to TBIJ, these negotiation tactics resulted in a months long delay in Pfizer reaching a vaccine agreement with one country and a complete failure to reach agreements with two other countries, including Argentina and Brazil.

In November 2021, TBMJ published an article after obtaining information from a whistleblower from the Ventavia Research Group. Ventavia was hired by Pfizer as a research subcontractor. A regional director (whistleblower) who was employed at Ventavia Research Group has told The BMJ that the company falsified data, unblinded patients, employed inadequately trained vaccinators, and was slow to follow up on adverse events reported in Pfizer's pivotal phase III trial. The regional director, Brook Jackson, emailed a complaint to the FDA. Ventavia fired her later the same day. The European Medicines Agency (EMA) stated in a response to the European Parliament, that "the deficiencies identified do not jeopardize the quality and integrity of the data from the main Comirnaty trial and have no impact on the benefit-risk assessment or on the conclusions on the safety, effectiveness and quality of the vaccine". Science-Based Medicine emphasized that Ventavia oversaw just three of the 153 clinical sites involved with Pfizer's trial and "a small fraction (~1,000 by the time the whistleblower was fired) of the trial's over ~44,000 subjects."

On October 10, 2022, during a session of the European Parliament's Special Committee on the COVID-19 Pandemic, Pfizer executive Janine Small testified that the company had not evaluated the Pfizer–BioNTech COVID-19 vaccine for its ability to reduce transmission of the SARS-CoV-2 virus prior to its release to the general public. Dutch MEP Rob Roos described the admission as "scandalous". CEO Albert Bourla was slated to attend, but withdrew. Roos's statements in turn have been described as "misleading".

=== Zantac Lawsuits ===
In May 2024 Pfizer agreed to settle more than 10,000 US lawsuits alleging that it had hidden cancer risks of the heartburn drug Zantac (ranitidine). Pfizer said it had sold Zantac only for a limited period, more than 15 years earlier. The terms were not disclosed.

== Environmental record ==
Since 2000, the company has implemented more than 4,000 greenhouse gas reduction projects.

Pfizer has inherited Wyeth's liabilities in the American Cyanamid site in Bridgewater Township, New Jersey, a highly toxic EPA Superfund site. Pfizer has since attempted to remediate this land in order to clean and develop it for future profits and potential public uses. The Sierra Club and the Edison Wetlands Association have opposed the cleanup plan, arguing that the area is subject to flooding, which could cause pollutants to leach. The EPA considers the plan the most reasonable from considerations of safety and cost-effectiveness, arguing that an alternative plan involving trucking contaminated soil off site could expose cleanup workers. The EPA's position is backed by the environmental watchdog group CRISIS.

In June 2002, a chemical explosion at the Groton plant injured seven people and caused the evacuation of more than 100 homes in the surrounding area.

== Lobbying ==
The company engages in lobbying in the United States. It also lobbies the Government of Ontario and House of Commons of Canada through Rubicon Strategy, a firm owned by Progressive Conservative Party of Ontario campaign manager Kory Teneycke. Pfizer lobbied various officials in the Government of British Columbia between April and November 2012, including then-premier Christy Clark, future premier John Horgan, future health minister Adrian Dix, and future deputy premier, minister of public safety and solicitor general Mike Farnworth.

Notable lobbying organizations or think tanks to which the company has contributed include BIOTECanada, Bipartisan Policy Center, The Business Council, Business Council for the United Nations, Center on Budget and Policy Priorities, European Federation of Pharmaceutical Industries and Associations, Foundation for the National Institutes of Health, Global Health Council, Innovative Medicines Canada, International Federation of Pharmaceutical Manufacturers & Associations, National Health Council, Pharmaceutical Advertising Advisory Board, Pharmaceutical Research and Manufacturers of America, Reagan-Udall Foundation, U.S. Global Leadership Coalition, and World Economic Forum.

== Awards and recognition ==
Pfizer has received various awards and recognitions related to its workplace policies and corporate practices.

In the United States, Pfizer earned a 100% score from the Human Rights Campaign (2025) on the Corporate Equality Index for LGBTQ workplace equality and ranked highly in the Hispanic Association on Corporate Responsibility (2024) Corporate Inclusion Index. Pfizer was named a "Best Place to Work for Disability Inclusion" in the Disability Equality Index (2024) and received awards such as Top Diverse Employer, Top Hispanic Employer, and Top Disability-Friendly Company by DiversityComm, Inc. (2024). Other recognitions include being named one of "America's Greatest Workplaces" by Newsweek (2023), Clinical Trials Arena Excellence Awards 2023, inclusion in the top 10 of the "World's Most Admired Companies" by Fortune (2023), and being listed as a Top Employer for Diversity and Best Employer for Women by Forbes (2022). Pfizer was also recognized as a "Best Place to Work" by Glassdoor (2021) and a Top Employer by Science (2021) for its practices during the pandemic.

== Corporate affairs ==
=== Board of directors ===
As of December 2024, the company's board consisted of the following directors:

- Ronald E. Blaylock, Managing Partner of GenNx360 Capital Partners
- Albert Bourla, CEO of Pfizer
- Mortimer J. Buckley, former CEO of The Vanguard Group
- Sue Desmond-Hellmann, former CEO of The Bill and Melinda Gates Foundation
- Joseph J. Echevarria, former CEO of Deloitte LLP
- Scott Gottlieb, former Commissioner of the FDA
- Helen Hobbs, Professor at the University of Texas Southwestern Medical Center
- Susan Hockfield, 16th President of the Massachusetts Institute of Technology
- Dan Littman, professor of Molecular Immunology at New York University
- Shantanu Narayen, CEO of Adobe
- Suzanne Nora Johnson, former Vice Chairman of Goldman Sachs
- James Quincey, CEO of The Coca-Cola Company
- James C. Smith, former CEO of Thomson Reuters
- Cyrus Taraporevala, former president and CEO of State Street Global Advisor

=== Philanthropy ===
Pfizer sponsors the Royal Society Pfizer Award and The Pfizer Award.

In 2022, Pfizer launched the "An Accord for a Healthier World" initiative, which provides Pfizer's medicines and vaccines to 45 lower-income countries on a not-for-profit basis.

Notable organizations to which Pfizer has provided funding include the Institute for Advanced Study, University of Toronto, and member of the President's Circle. University of Washington, Habitat for Humanity, Human Rights Campaign, National Women's Law Center, Share Our Strength, WaterAid, National Geographic, National Geographic Society, 94th Academy Awards, National Press Foundation, 19 to Zero, American Society of Hematology, Canadian Cancer Society, Canadian Paediatric Society, Endocrine Society, and European Society of Cardiology.

Notable professional associations to which Pfizer has contributed include American Statistical Association, Canadian Association of Emergency Physicians, Canadian Medical Association, Canadian Pharmacists Association, Canadian Pharmacists Journal, Canadian Public Health Association, Ontario Medical Association, Centre for Addiction and Mental Health, Dana–Farber Cancer Institute, Hospital for Sick Children (SickKids), North Bay Regional Health Center, Princess Margaret Cancer Centre, Scarborough Health Network, Sinai Health Foundation, including Mount Sinai Hospital, Bridgepoint Active Healthcare, and the Lunenfeld-Tanenbaum Research Institute, Sunnybrook Health Sciences Centre – Donor. William Osler Health System, Ronald McDonald House Charities, AdvaMed, Arthritis Australia, Drugs for Neglected Diseases Initiative, GISAID, Heart and Stroke Foundation of Canada, Mount Sinai Hospital (Toronto), and Truth Initiative.

== See also ==
- Biotech and pharmaceutical companies in the New York metropolitan area
- Companies of the United States with untaxed profits
- Fire in the Blood (2013 film)
- List of pharmaceutical companies
- Pfizer Building, its former New York City headquarters
- Pfizergate
