= William C. Steere Jr. =

American pharma executive (born 1936)

- Born: June 17, 1936 (age 90)
- Education: Stanford University (1959)
- Known for: Former Pfizer CEO
- Spouse: Lynda Gay Powers (m. January 29, 1957)
- Children: 3 sons
- Father: William C. Steere

William C. Steere Jr. (born June 17, 1936) is a former chief executive officer of Pfizer. He is also a member of the board of directors of the New York Botanical Garden. While Steere was CEO of Pfizer, the company acquired Warner-Lambert and brought to market blockbuster drugs including Viagra, Zoloft, and Zithromax. His decision to triple research expenditures in 8 years, to $2.2 billion, was cited as a reason for the prosperity of Pfizer during his tenure, a period in which sales of the company doubled.

== Early life and education ==
Steere was born in 1936 in Ann Arbor, Michigan. Steere's father, William C. Steere, was an American botanist known as an expert on bryophytes. In 1959, Steere graduated from Stanford University with a B.S. in Biology.

== Career ==
Upon graduation in 1959, Steere began a career at Pfizer as a medical service representative. He became Director of Marketing for Pfizer Latin America in 1969. In 1972, he became Vice President-General Manager of Roerig, a division of Pfizer Pharmaceuticals. He became vice president of Pfizer Laboratories in 1980, Corporate Vice President of Pfizer in 1983, President of Pfizer Pharmaceuticals in 1986, President of Pfizer in 1990 and chief executive officer from 1991 to 2000. In 2011, he retired from the board of directors of the company.

=== Board memberships ===
Between 1997 and 2007, Steere was a member of the board of directors of Dow Jones & Company. From 1999 to 2010, he was a member of the board of directors of MetLife.

Steere was a member of the executive committee of the Pharmaceutical Research and Manufacturers of America; a member of the board of overseers of the Memorial Sloan-Kettering Cancer Center and of The Business Roundtable; and a director of the Council on Competitiveness, the New York University Medical Center, WNET, The Business Council, Texaco, and the New York Botanical Garden. He served as a class B director of the Federal Reserve Bank of New York, having been elected for a three-year term ending December 31, 1995.

== Personal life ==
Steere married Lynda Gay Powers on January 29, 1957. They have 3 sons.

While working at Pfizer, Steere resided in Darien, Connecticut.

Steere enjoys scuba diving and spearfishing and lives in Bonita Springs, Florida, where he owns a boat and a marina.

Steere has made campaign contributions, most of which were to members of the Republican Party.
