= Orforglipron =

Anti-obesity medication

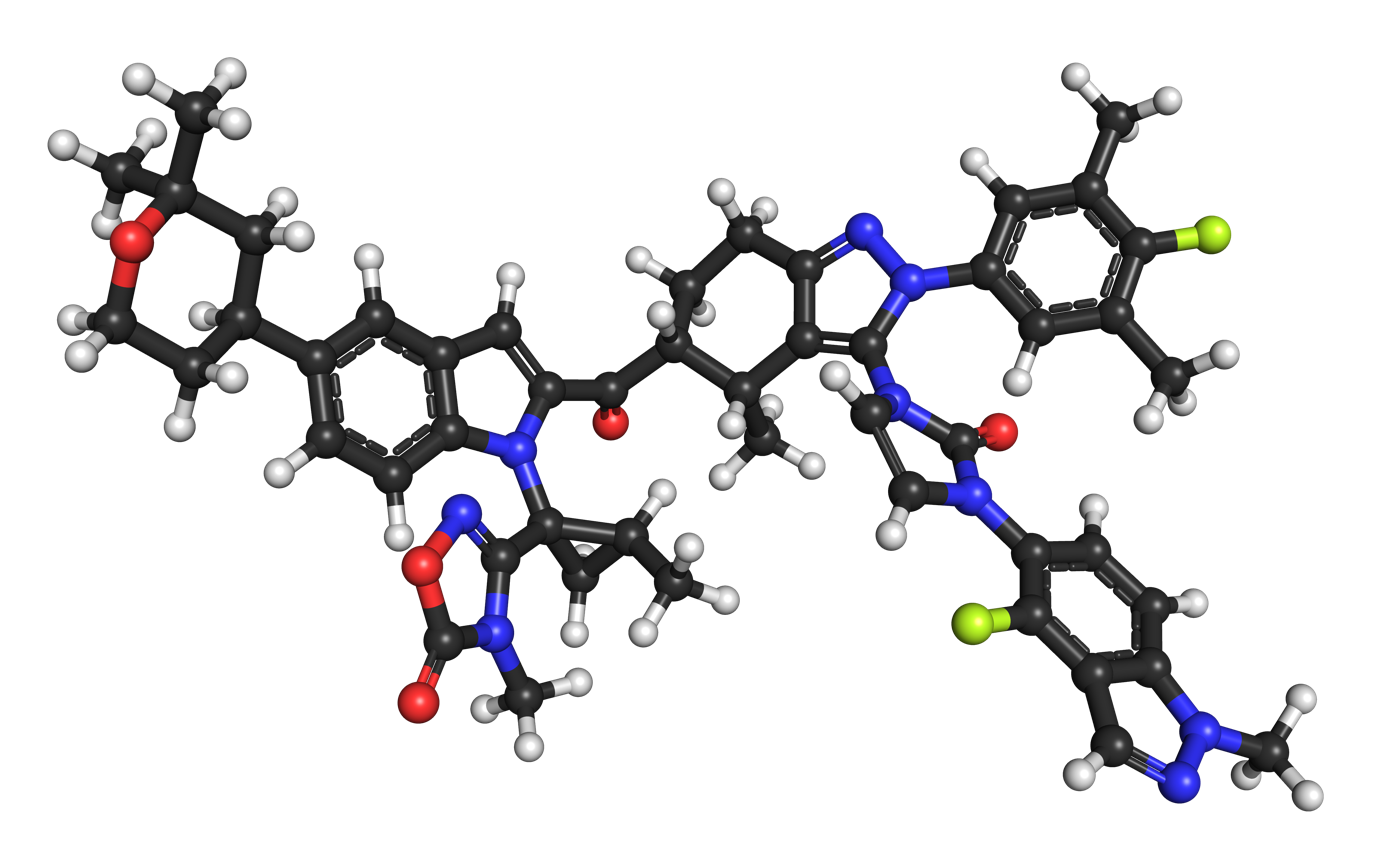
- Above: skeletal diagram Below: 3D representation

Clinical data
- Trade names: Foundayo
- Other names: LY-3502970
- AHFS/Drugs.com: Monograph
- MedlinePlus: a626059
- License data: US DailyMed: Orforglipron
- Routes of administration: Oral
- Drug class: Antidiabetic, GLP-1 receptor agonist
- ATC code: None

Legal status
- Legal status: US: ℞-only

Pharmacokinetic data
- Elimination half-life: 29–49 hours

Identifiers
- IUPAC name: 3-[(1S,2S)-1-[5-[(4S)-2,2-dimethyloxan-4-yl]-2-[(4S)-2-(4-fluoro-3,5-dimethylphenyl)-3-[3-(4-fluoro-1-methylindazol-5-yl)-2-oxoimidazol-1-yl]-4-methyl-6,7-dihydro-4H-pyrazolo[4,3-c]pyridine-5-carbonyl]indol-1-yl]-2-methylcyclopropyl]-4H-1,2,4-oxadiazol-5-one
- CAS Number: 2212020-52-3; as salt: 2415797-61-2
- PubChem CID: 137319706; as salt: 167713250
- DrugBank: DB18964
- ChemSpider: 71117507
- UNII: 7ZW40D021M; as salt: VI5M9OZV2X
- KEGG: D12536; as salt: D12529
- ChEMBL: ChEMBL4446782
- PDB ligand: V6G (PDBe, RCSB PDB)

Chemical and physical data
- Formula: C_{48}H_{48}F_{2}N_{10}O_{5}
- Molar mass: 882.974 g·mol^{−1}
- 3D model (JSmol): Interactive image
- SMILES: Cc1cc(-n2nc3c(c2-n2ccn(-c4ccc5c(cnn5C)c4F)c2=O)[C@H](C)N(C(=O)c2cc4cc([C@H]5CCOC(C)(C)C5)ccc4n2[C@@]2(c4noc(=O)[nH]4)C[C@@H]2C)CC3)cc(C)c1F
- InChI: InChI=1S/C48H48F2N10O5/c1-25-18-32(19-26(2)40(25)49)60-42(58-16-15-57(46(58)63)37-11-10-36-33(41(37)50)24-51-55(36)7)39-28(4)56(14-12-34(39)53-60)43(61)38-21-31-20-29(30-13-17-64-47(5,6)23-30)8-9-35(31)59(38)48(22-27(48)3)44-52-45(62)65-54-44/h8-11,15-16,18-21,24,27-28,30H,12-14,17,22-23H2,1-7H3,(H,52,54,62)/t27-,28-,30-,48-/m0/s1; Key:USUWIEBBBWHKNI-KHIFEHGGSA-N

Orforglipron, sold under the brand name Foundayo, is a medication used for weight management. It is an oral, non-peptide, small-molecule GLP-1 receptor agonist developed as a weight loss drug by Eli Lilly and Company. It was discovered by Chugai Pharmaceutical Co., then was licensed to Lilly in 2018.

Orforglipron was approved for medical use in the United States in April 2026. It was approved for use in the UK in August 2026.

== Medical uses ==
Orforglipron is indicated in combination with a reduced-calorie diet and increased physical activity to reduce excess body weight and maintain weight reduction long term in adults with obesity or adults with overweight in the presence of at least one weight-related comorbid condition.

== Adverse effects ==
Safety and dosing trials showed that the incidence of adverse events in orforglipron-treated participants was 62–89%, mostly from gastrointestinal discomfort (44–70% with orforglipron, 18% with placebo); in patients experiencing adverse events, 96% had mild to moderate GI side effects, while approximately 4% had severe nausea or vomiting. The most common side effects of orforglipon noted in clinical trials were vomiting, diarrhea, nausea, upset stomach, and constipation.

== Mechanism of action ==
Orforglipron is a small-molecule, partial GLP-1 receptor agonist affecting the activity of cyclic adenosine monophosphate (cAMP); its effects are similar to the actions of glucagon-like peptide-1 (GLP-1) for reducing food intake and lowering blood glucose levels.

== Society and culture ==
=== Legal status ===
In October 2026, the Committee for Medicinal Products for Human Use of the European Medicines Agency adopted a positive opinion, recommending the granting of a marketing authorization for the medicinal product Foundayo, intended for the treatment of type 2 diabetes and for weight management. The applicant for this medicinal product is Eli Lilly Nederland.

=== Names ===
Orforglipron is the international nonproprietary name.

Orforglipron is sold under the brand name Foundayo.
