= List of MeSH codes (E01) =

The following is a partial list of the "E" codes for Medical Subject Headings (MeSH), as defined by the United States National Library of Medicine (NLM).

This list continues the information at List of MeSH codes (D27). Codes following these are found at List of MeSH codes (E02). For other MeSH codes, see List of MeSH codes.

The source for this content is the set of 2006 MeSH Trees from the NLM.

== MeSH E01 – diagnosis ==
=== MeSH E01.158 – diagnosis, computer-assisted ===
==== MeSH E01.158.600 – image interpretation, computer-assisted ====
- MeSH E01.158.600.339 – neuronavigation
- MeSH E01.158.600.680 – radiographic image interpretation, computer-assisted

=== MeSH E01.370 – diagnostic techniques and procedures ===
==== MeSH E01.370.350 – diagnostic imaging ====
- MeSH E01.370.350.350 – image interpretation, computer-assisted
- MeSH E01.370.350.350.349 – neuronavigation
- MeSH E01.370.350.350.700 – radiographic image interpretation, computer-assisted
- MeSH E01.370.350.350.800 – tomography, emission-computed
- MeSH E01.370.350.350.800.700 – positron-emission tomography
- MeSH E01.370.350.350.800.800 – tomography, emission-computed, single-photon
- MeSH E01.370.350.350.810 – tomography, x-ray computed
- MeSH E01.370.350.350.810.180 – colonography, computed tomographic
- MeSH E01.370.350.350.810.800 – tomography, spiral computed
- MeSH E01.370.350.400 – imaging, three-dimensional
- MeSH E01.370.350.400.200 – echocardiography, three-dimensional
- MeSH E01.370.350.400.200.230 – echocardiography, four-dimensional
- MeSH E01.370.350.400.500 – holography
- MeSH E01.370.350.500 – magnetic resonance imaging
- MeSH E01.370.350.500.100 – cholangiopancreatography, magnetic resonance
- MeSH E01.370.350.500.150 – diffusion magnetic resonance imaging
- MeSH E01.370.350.500.200 – echo-planar imaging
- MeSH E01.370.350.500.500 – magnetic resonance angiography
- MeSH E01.370.350.500.510 – magnetic resonance imaging, cine
- MeSH E01.370.350.515 – microscopy
- MeSH E01.370.350.515.184 – dermoscopy
- MeSH E01.370.350.515.370 – microscopy, acoustic
- MeSH E01.370.350.515.395 – microscopy, confocal
- MeSH E01.370.350.515.395.500 – laser scanning cytometry
- MeSH E01.370.350.515.402 – microscopy, electron
- MeSH E01.370.350.515.402.150 – cryoelectron microscopy
- MeSH E01.370.350.515.402.250 – electron probe microanalysis
- MeSH E01.370.350.515.402.541 – microscopy, electron, scanning
- MeSH E01.370.350.515.402.580 – microscopy, electron, transmission
- MeSH E01.370.350.515.402.580.480 – microscopy, electron, scanning transmission
- MeSH E01.370.350.515.402.580.500 – microscopy, energy-filtering transmission electron
- MeSH E01.370.350.515.402.625 – microscopy, immunoelectron
- MeSH E01.370.350.515.458 – microscopy, fluorescence
- MeSH E01.370.350.515.458.500 – microscopy, fluorescence, multiphoton
- MeSH E01.370.350.515.513 – microscopy, interference
- MeSH E01.370.350.515.513.569 – microscopy, phase-contrast
- MeSH E01.370.350.515.624 – microscopy, polarization
- MeSH E01.370.350.515.666 – microscopy, scanning probe
- MeSH E01.370.350.515.666.400 – microscopy, atomic force
- MeSH E01.370.350.515.666.500 – microscopy, scanning tunneling
- MeSH E01.370.350.515.680 – microscopy, ultraviolet
- MeSH E01.370.350.515.690 – microscopy, video
- MeSH E01.370.350.515.799 – photomicrography
- MeSH E01.370.350.600 – photography
- MeSH E01.370.350.600.300 – holography
- MeSH E01.370.350.600.350 – image enhancement
- MeSH E01.370.350.600.350.700 – radiographic image enhancement
- MeSH E01.370.350.600.350.700.060 – angiography, digital subtraction
- MeSH E01.370.350.600.350.700.690 – radiography, dental, digital
- MeSH E01.370.350.600.350.700.700 – radiography, dual-energy scanned projection
- MeSH E01.370.350.600.350.700.810 – tomography, x-ray computed
- MeSH E01.370.350.600.350.700.810.180 – colonography, computed tomographic
- MeSH E01.370.350.600.350.700.810.800 – tomography, spiral computed
- MeSH E01.370.350.600.350.800 – tomography, emission-computed
- MeSH E01.370.350.600.350.800.399 – positron-emission tomography
- MeSH E01.370.350.600.350.800.800 – tomography, emission-computed, single-photon
- MeSH E01.370.350.600.625 – photofluorography
- MeSH E01.370.350.600.630 – photogrammetry
- MeSH E01.370.350.600.630.500 – moire topography
- MeSH E01.370.350.600.631 – photography, dental
- MeSH E01.370.350.600.635 – photomicrography
- MeSH E01.370.350.700 – radiography
- MeSH E01.370.350.700.050 – age determination by skeleton
- MeSH E01.370.350.700.060 – angiography
- MeSH E01.370.350.700.060.050 – angiocardiography
- MeSH E01.370.350.700.060.060 – angiography, digital subtraction
- MeSH E01.370.350.700.060.070 – aortography
- MeSH E01.370.350.700.060.180 – cerebral angiography
- MeSH E01.370.350.700.060.190 – cineangiography
- MeSH E01.370.350.700.060.200 – coronary angiography
- MeSH E01.370.350.700.060.600 – phlebography
- MeSH E01.370.350.700.060.610 – portography
- MeSH E01.370.350.700.070 – arthrography
- MeSH E01.370.350.700.150 – cineradiography
- MeSH E01.370.350.700.150.190 – cineangiography
- MeSH E01.370.350.700.175 – densitometry, x-ray
- MeSH E01.370.350.700.200 – electrokymography
- MeSH E01.370.350.700.225 – fluoroscopy
- MeSH E01.370.350.700.225.625 – photofluorography
- MeSH E01.370.350.700.325 – hysterosalpingography
- MeSH E01.370.350.700.475 – lymphography
- MeSH E01.370.350.700.500 – mammography
- MeSH E01.370.350.700.500.975 – xeromammography
- MeSH E01.370.350.700.510 – microradiography
- MeSH E01.370.350.700.560 – neuroradiography
- MeSH E01.370.350.700.560.180 – cerebral angiography
- MeSH E01.370.350.700.560.190 – cerebral ventriculography
- MeSH E01.370.350.700.560.260 – echoencephalography
- MeSH E01.370.350.700.560.260.850 – ultrasonography, doppler, transcranial
- MeSH E01.370.350.700.560.505 – myelography
- MeSH E01.370.350.700.560.620 – pneumoencephalography
- MeSH E01.370.350.700.625 – pneumoradiography
- MeSH E01.370.350.700.625.620 – pneumoencephalography
- MeSH E01.370.350.700.700 – radiographic image enhancement
- MeSH E01.370.350.700.700.060 – angiography, digital subtraction
- MeSH E01.370.350.700.700.690 – radiography, dental, digital
- MeSH E01.370.350.700.700.700 – radiography, dual-energy scanned projection
- MeSH E01.370.350.700.700.810 – tomography, x-ray computed
- MeSH E01.370.350.700.700.810.180 – colonography, computed tomographic
- MeSH E01.370.350.700.700.810.800 – tomography, spiral computed
- MeSH E01.370.350.700.705 – radiographic image interpretation, computer-assisted
- MeSH E01.370.350.700.710 – radiographic magnification
- MeSH E01.370.350.700.715 – radiography, abdominal
- MeSH E01.370.350.700.715.200 – cholangiography
- MeSH E01.370.350.700.715.200.200 – cholangiopancreatography, endoscopic retrograde
- MeSH E01.370.350.700.715.200.215 – cholangiopancreatography, magnetic resonance
- MeSH E01.370.350.700.715.210 – cholecystography
- MeSH E01.370.350.700.715.250 – defecography
- MeSH E01.370.350.700.715.610 – portography
- MeSH E01.370.350.700.720 – radiography, dental
- MeSH E01.370.350.700.720.050 – age determination by teeth
- MeSH E01.370.350.700.720.700 – radiography, bitewing
- MeSH E01.370.350.700.720.720 – radiography, dental, digital
- MeSH E01.370.350.700.720.750 – radiography, panoramic
- MeSH E01.370.350.700.720.793 – sialography
- MeSH E01.370.350.700.725 – radiography, interventional
- MeSH E01.370.350.700.730 – radiography, thoracic
- MeSH E01.370.350.700.730.100 – bronchography
- MeSH E01.370.350.700.730.500 – mass chest x-ray
- MeSH E01.370.350.700.810 – tomography, x-ray
- MeSH E01.370.350.700.810.810 – tomography, x-ray computed
- MeSH E01.370.350.700.810.810.180 – colonography, computed tomographic
- MeSH E01.370.350.700.810.810.800 – tomography, spiral computed
- MeSH E01.370.350.700.830 – urography
- MeSH E01.370.350.700.975 – xeroradiography
- MeSH E01.370.350.700.975.975 – xeromammography
- MeSH E01.370.350.710 – radionuclide imaging
- MeSH E01.370.350.710.050 – absorptiometry, photon
- MeSH E01.370.350.710.710 – radioimmunodetection
- MeSH E01.370.350.710.715 – radionuclide angiography
- MeSH E01.370.350.710.715.700 – radioisotope renography
- MeSH E01.370.350.710.715.710 – radionuclide ventriculography
- MeSH E01.370.350.710.715.710.350 – gated blood-pool imaging
- MeSH E01.370.350.710.715.710.950 – ventriculography, first-pass
- MeSH E01.370.350.710.800 – tomography, emission-computed
- MeSH E01.370.350.710.800.399 – positron-emission tomography
- MeSH E01.370.350.710.800.800 – tomography, emission-computed, single-photon
- MeSH E01.370.350.750 – spectroscopy, near-infrared
- MeSH E01.370.350.755 – stroboscopy
- MeSH E01.370.350.760 – subtraction technique
- MeSH E01.370.350.760.060 – angiography, digital subtraction
- MeSH E01.370.350.760.700 – radiography, dual-energy scanned projection
- MeSH E01.370.350.800 – thermography
- MeSH E01.370.350.825 – tomography
- MeSH E01.370.350.825.500 – magnetic resonance imaging
- MeSH E01.370.350.825.500.100 – cholangiopancreatography, magnetic resonance
- MeSH E01.370.350.825.500.150 – diffusion magnetic resonance imaging
- MeSH E01.370.350.825.500.200 – echo-planar imaging
- MeSH E01.370.350.825.500.500 – magnetic resonance angiography
- MeSH E01.370.350.825.500.510 – magnetic resonance imaging, cine
- MeSH E01.370.350.825.800 – tomography, emission-computed
- MeSH E01.370.350.825.800.399 – positron-emission tomography
- MeSH E01.370.350.825.800.800 – tomography, emission-computed, single-photon
- MeSH E01.370.350.825.805 – tomography, optical
- MeSH E01.370.350.825.805.500 – tomography, optical coherence
- MeSH E01.370.350.825.810 – tomography, x-ray
- MeSH E01.370.350.825.810.810 – tomography, x-ray computed
- MeSH E01.370.350.825.810.810.800 – tomography, spiral computed
- MeSH E01.370.350.840 – transillumination
- MeSH E01.370.350.850 – ultrasonography
- MeSH E01.370.350.850.220 – echocardiography
- MeSH E01.370.350.850.220.220 – echocardiography, doppler
- MeSH E01.370.350.850.220.220.220 – echocardiography, doppler, color
- MeSH E01.370.350.850.220.220.225 – echocardiography, doppler, pulsed
- MeSH E01.370.350.850.220.228 – echocardiography, stress
- MeSH E01.370.350.850.220.230 – echocardiography, three-dimensional
- MeSH E01.370.350.850.220.230.230 – echocardiography, four-dimensional
- MeSH E01.370.350.850.220.235 – echocardiography, transesophageal
- MeSH E01.370.350.850.260 – echoencephalography
- MeSH E01.370.350.850.260.850 – ultrasonography, doppler, transcranial
- MeSH E01.370.350.850.280 – endosonography
- MeSH E01.370.350.850.565 – microscopy, acoustic
- MeSH E01.370.350.850.850 – ultrasonography, doppler
- MeSH E01.370.350.850.850.220 – echocardiography, doppler
- MeSH E01.370.350.850.850.220.220 – echocardiography, doppler, color
- MeSH E01.370.350.850.850.220.225 – echocardiography, doppler, pulsed
- MeSH E01.370.350.850.850.850 – ultrasonography, doppler, duplex
- MeSH E01.370.350.850.850.850.850 – ultrasonography, doppler, color
- MeSH E01.370.350.850.850.850.850.220 – echocardiography, doppler, color
- MeSH E01.370.350.850.850.860 – ultrasonography, doppler, pulsed
- MeSH E01.370.350.850.850.860.225 – echocardiography, doppler, pulsed
- MeSH E01.370.350.850.850.870 – ultrasonography, doppler, transcranial
- MeSH E01.370.350.850.855 – ultrasonography, interventional
- MeSH E01.370.350.850.860 – ultrasonography, mammary
- MeSH E01.370.350.850.865 – ultrasonography, prenatal
- MeSH E01.370.350.850.865.500 – nuchal translucency measurement
- MeSH E01.370.350.925 – whole body imaging

==== MeSH E01.370.370 – diagnostic techniques, cardiovascular ====
- MeSH E01.370.370.050 – angiography
- MeSH E01.370.370.050.050 – angiocardiography
- MeSH E01.370.370.050.060 – angiography, digital subtraction
- MeSH E01.370.370.050.070 – aortography
- MeSH E01.370.370.050.180 – cerebral angiography
- MeSH E01.370.370.050.190 – cineangiography
- MeSH E01.370.370.050.200 – coronary angiography
- MeSH E01.370.370.050.350 – fluorescein angiography
- MeSH E01.370.370.050.500 – magnetic resonance angiography
- MeSH E01.370.370.050.600 – phlebography
- MeSH E01.370.370.050.610 – portography
- MeSH E01.370.370.050.650 – radionuclide angiography
- MeSH E01.370.370.050.650.650 – radionuclide ventriculography
- MeSH E01.370.370.050.650.650.350 – gated blood-pool imaging
- MeSH E01.370.370.050.650.650.950 – ventriculography, first-pass
- MeSH E01.370.370.065 – angioscopy
- MeSH E01.370.370.120 – blood circulation time
- MeSH E01.370.370.130 – blood flow velocity
- MeSH E01.370.370.140 – blood pressure determination
- MeSH E01.370.370.140.100 – blood pressure monitoring, ambulatory
- MeSH E01.370.370.150 – blood volume determination
- MeSH E01.370.370.170 – capillary fragility
- MeSH E01.370.370.380 – heart function tests
- MeSH E01.370.370.380.050 – angiocardiography
- MeSH E01.370.370.380.100 – ballistocardiography
- MeSH E01.370.370.380.150 – cardiac output
- MeSH E01.370.370.380.150.700 – stroke volume
- MeSH E01.370.370.380.160 – cardiography, impedance
- MeSH E01.370.370.380.170 – cardiotocography
- MeSH E01.370.370.380.200 – coronary angiography
- MeSH E01.370.370.380.220 – echocardiography
- MeSH E01.370.370.380.220.220 – echocardiography, doppler
- MeSH E01.370.370.380.220.220.220 – echocardiography, doppler, color
- MeSH E01.370.370.380.220.220.225 – echocardiography, doppler, pulsed
- MeSH E01.370.370.380.220.228 – echocardiography, stress
- MeSH E01.370.370.380.220.230 – echocardiography, three-dimensional
- MeSH E01.370.370.380.220.230.230 – echocardiography, four-dimensional
- MeSH E01.370.370.380.220.235 – echocardiography, transesophageal
- MeSH E01.370.370.380.240 – electrocardiography
- MeSH E01.370.370.380.240.100 – body surface potential mapping
- MeSH E01.370.370.380.240.230 – electrocardiography, ambulatory
- MeSH E01.370.370.380.240.850 – vectorcardiography
- MeSH E01.370.370.380.240.850.100 – body surface potential mapping
- MeSH E01.370.370.380.245 – electrophysiologic techniques, cardiac
- MeSH E01.370.370.380.250 – exercise test
- MeSH E01.370.370.380.400 – heart auscultation
- MeSH E01.370.370.380.400.500 – phonocardiography
- MeSH E01.370.370.380.410 – heart catheterization
- MeSH E01.370.370.380.410.200 – catheter ablation
- MeSH E01.370.370.380.410.210 – catheterization, swan-ganz
- MeSH E01.370.370.380.450 – kinetocardiography
- MeSH E01.370.370.380.600 – oximetry
- MeSH E01.370.370.380.600.100 – blood gas monitoring, transcutaneous
- MeSH E01.370.370.380.650 – pulse
- MeSH E01.370.370.380.710 – radionuclide ventriculography
- MeSH E01.370.370.380.710.350 – gated blood-pool imaging
- MeSH E01.370.370.380.710.950 – ventriculography, first-pass
- MeSH E01.370.370.380.950 – valsalva maneuver
- MeSH E01.370.370.475 – laser-doppler flowmetry
- MeSH E01.370.370.560 – microscopic angioscopy
- MeSH E01.370.370.610 – plethysmography
- MeSH E01.370.370.610.600 – photoplethysmography
- MeSH E01.370.370.610.610 – plethysmography, impedance
- MeSH E01.370.370.610.610.200 – cardiography, impedance
- MeSH E01.370.370.750 – tilt-table test

==== MeSH E01.370.372 – diagnostic techniques, digestive system ====
- MeSH E01.370.372.200 – cholangiography
- MeSH E01.370.372.200.200 – cholangiopancreatography, endoscopic retrograde
- MeSH E01.370.372.200.215 – cholangiopancreatography, magnetic resonance
- MeSH E01.370.372.210 – cholecystography
- MeSH E01.370.372.230 – colonography, computed tomographic
- MeSH E01.370.372.250 – endoscopy, digestive system
- MeSH E01.370.372.250.200 – cholangiopancreatography, endoscopic retrograde
- MeSH E01.370.372.250.250 – endoscopy, gastrointestinal
- MeSH E01.370.372.250.250.200 – colonoscopy
- MeSH E01.370.372.250.250.200.700 – sigmoidoscopy
- MeSH E01.370.372.250.250.225 – duodenoscopy
- MeSH E01.370.372.250.250.325 – gastroscopy
- MeSH E01.370.372.250.250.600 – proctoscopy
- MeSH E01.370.372.250.260 – esophagoscopy
- MeSH E01.370.372.255 – esophageal ph monitoring
- MeSH E01.370.372.300 – gastric acidity determination
- MeSH E01.370.372.310 – gastrointestinal transit
- MeSH E01.370.372.450 – lactose tolerance test
- MeSH E01.370.372.460 – liver function tests
- MeSH E01.370.372.600 – pancreatic function tests
- MeSH E01.370.372.610 – portography
- MeSH E01.370.372.700 – sialography

==== MeSH E01.370.374 – diagnostic techniques, endocrine ====
- MeSH E01.370.374.050 – adrenal cortex function tests
- MeSH E01.370.374.100 – blood glucose self-monitoring
- MeSH E01.370.374.355 – glucose tolerance test
- MeSH E01.370.374.530 – ovarian function tests
- MeSH E01.370.374.600 – pituitary-adrenal function tests
- MeSH E01.370.374.605 – pituitary function tests
- MeSH E01.370.374.650 – radioligand assay
- MeSH E01.370.374.750 – thyroid function tests
- MeSH E01.370.374.750.100 – basal metabolism

==== MeSH E01.370.376 – diagnostic techniques, neurological ====
- MeSH E01.370.376.300 – electroencephalography
- MeSH E01.370.376.300.100 – alpha rhythm
- MeSH E01.370.376.300.125 – beta rhythm
- MeSH E01.370.376.300.150 – cortical synchronization
- MeSH E01.370.376.300.175 – delta rhythm
- MeSH E01.370.376.300.700 – theta rhythm
- MeSH E01.370.376.500 – magnetoencephalography
- MeSH E01.370.376.550 – neurologic examination
- MeSH E01.370.376.550.600 – pain measurement
- MeSH E01.370.376.550.650 – reflex
- MeSH E01.370.376.550.650.650 – reflex, abdominal
- MeSH E01.370.376.550.650.655 – reflex, abnormal
- MeSH E01.370.376.550.650.655.400 – reflex, babinski
- MeSH E01.370.376.550.650.670 – reflex, acoustic
- MeSH E01.370.376.550.650.690 – reflex, pupillary
- MeSH E01.370.376.550.650.700 – reflex, stretch
- MeSH E01.370.376.550.650.800 – startle reaction
- MeSH E01.370.376.560 – neuroradiography
- MeSH E01.370.376.560.180 – cerebral angiography
- MeSH E01.370.376.560.190 – cerebral ventriculography
- MeSH E01.370.376.560.260 – echoencephalography
- MeSH E01.370.376.560.260.850 – ultrasonography, doppler, transcranial
- MeSH E01.370.376.560.505 – myelography
- MeSH E01.370.376.560.620 – pneumoencephalography
- MeSH E01.370.376.700 – spinal puncture
- MeSH E01.370.376.850 – transcranial magnetic stimulation

==== MeSH E01.370.378 – diagnostic techniques, obstetrical and gynecological ====
- MeSH E01.370.378.150 – colposcopy
- MeSH E01.370.378.155 – culdoscopy
- MeSH E01.370.378.225 – fallopian tube patency tests
- MeSH E01.370.378.230 – fetal monitoring
- MeSH E01.370.378.230.150 – cardiotocography
- MeSH E01.370.378.325 – hysterosalpingography
- MeSH E01.370.378.330 – hysteroscopy
- MeSH E01.370.378.530 – ovarian function tests
- MeSH E01.370.378.530.550 – ovulation detection
- MeSH E01.370.378.530.775 – ovulation prediction
- MeSH E01.370.378.605 – pelvimetry
- MeSH E01.370.378.610 – placental function tests
- MeSH E01.370.378.620 – pregnancy tests
- MeSH E01.370.378.620.620 – pregnancy tests, immunologic
- MeSH E01.370.378.625 – preimplantation diagnosis
- MeSH E01.370.378.630 – prenatal diagnosis
- MeSH E01.370.378.630.050 – amniocentesis
- MeSH E01.370.378.630.150 – chorionic villi sampling
- MeSH E01.370.378.630.300 – fetoscopy
- MeSH E01.370.378.630.865 – ultrasonography, prenatal
- MeSH E01.370.378.630.865.500 – nuchal translucency measurement
- MeSH E01.370.378.850 – ultrasonography, mammary
- MeSH E01.370.378.860 – uterine monitoring
- MeSH E01.370.378.900 – vaginal smears

==== MeSH E01.370.380 – diagnostic techniques, ophthalmological ====
- MeSH E01.370.380.150 – corneal topography
- MeSH E01.370.380.225 – electroretinography
- MeSH E01.370.380.235 – eye movements
- MeSH E01.370.380.235.280 – electronystagmography
- MeSH E01.370.380.235.285 – electrooculography
- MeSH E01.370.380.245 – flicker fusion
- MeSH E01.370.380.250 – fluorescein angiography
- MeSH E01.370.380.255 – fluorophotometry
- MeSH E01.370.380.300 – gonioscopy
- MeSH E01.370.380.550 – ophthalmodynamometry
- MeSH E01.370.380.560 – ophthalmoscopy
- MeSH E01.370.380.560.500 – retinoscopy
- MeSH E01.370.380.750 – tonometry, ocular
- MeSH E01.370.380.850 – vision tests
- MeSH E01.370.380.850.150 – color perception tests
- MeSH E01.370.380.850.600 – perimetry
- MeSH E01.370.380.850.700 – refraction, ocular
- MeSH E01.370.380.850.900 – vision screening

==== MeSH E01.370.382 – diagnostic techniques, otological ====
- MeSH E01.370.382.375 – hearing tests
- MeSH E01.370.382.375.050 – acoustic impedance tests
- MeSH E01.370.382.375.060 – audiometry
- MeSH E01.370.382.375.060.050 – audiometry, evoked response
- MeSH E01.370.382.375.060.055 – audiometry, pure-tone
- MeSH E01.370.382.375.060.060 – audiometry, speech
- MeSH E01.370.382.375.060.060.750 – speech discrimination tests
- MeSH E01.370.382.375.060.060.760 – speech reception threshold test
- MeSH E01.370.382.375.200 – dichotic listening tests
- MeSH E01.370.382.375.650 – recruitment detection (audiology)
- MeSH E01.370.382.637 – otoscopy
- MeSH E01.370.382.900 – vestibular function tests
- MeSH E01.370.382.900.150 – caloric tests
- MeSH E01.370.382.900.280 – electronystagmography

==== MeSH E01.370.384 – diagnostic techniques, radioisotope ====
- MeSH E01.370.384.700 – radioimmunoassay
- MeSH E01.370.384.710 – radioisotope dilution technique
- MeSH E01.370.384.720 – radioligand assay
- MeSH E01.370.384.730 – radionuclide imaging
- MeSH E01.370.384.730.050 – absorptiometry, photon
- MeSH E01.370.384.730.710 – radioimmunodetection
- MeSH E01.370.384.730.715 – radionuclide angiography
- MeSH E01.370.384.730.715.700 – radioisotope renography
- MeSH E01.370.384.730.715.710 – radionuclide ventriculography
- MeSH E01.370.384.730.715.710.350 – gated blood-pool imaging
- MeSH E01.370.384.730.715.710.950 – ventriculography, first-pass
- MeSH E01.370.384.730.800 – tomography, emission-computed
- MeSH E01.370.384.730.800.399 – positron-emission tomography
- MeSH E01.370.384.730.800.800 – tomography, emission-computed, single-photon
- MeSH E01.370.384.750 – schilling test

==== MeSH E01.370.386 – diagnostic techniques, respiratory system ====
- MeSH E01.370.386.100 – bronchography
- MeSH E01.370.386.105 – bronchoscopy
- MeSH E01.370.386.460 – laryngoscopy
- MeSH E01.370.386.500 – mass chest x-ray
- MeSH E01.370.386.520 – mucociliary clearance
- MeSH E01.370.386.550 – Nasal provocation test
- MeSH E01.370.386.700 – respiratory function tests
- MeSH E01.370.386.700.050 – airway resistance
- MeSH E01.370.386.700.100 – blood gas analysis
- MeSH E01.370.386.700.100.600 – oximetry
- MeSH E01.370.386.700.100.600.100 – blood gas monitoring, transcutaneous
- MeSH E01.370.386.700.125 – bronchial provocation tests
- MeSH E01.370.386.700.150 – capnography
- MeSH E01.370.386.700.250 – exercise test
- MeSH E01.370.386.700.475 – lung compliance
- MeSH E01.370.386.700.485 – lung volume measurements
- MeSH E01.370.386.700.485.750 – total lung capacity
- MeSH E01.370.386.700.485.750.150 – closing volume
- MeSH E01.370.386.700.485.750.275 – functional residual capacity
- MeSH E01.370.386.700.485.750.275.260 – expiratory reserve volume
- MeSH E01.370.386.700.485.750.275.650 – residual volume
- MeSH E01.370.386.700.485.750.900 – vital capacity
- MeSH E01.370.386.700.485.750.900.260 – expiratory reserve volume
- MeSH E01.370.386.700.485.750.900.350 – inspiratory capacity
- MeSH E01.370.386.700.485.750.900.350.350 – inspiratory reserve volume
- MeSH E01.370.386.700.485.750.900.350.750 – tidal volume
- MeSH E01.370.386.700.615 – plethysmography, whole body
- MeSH E01.370.386.700.650 – pulmonary gas exchange
- MeSH E01.370.386.700.650.650 – pulmonary diffusing capacity
- MeSH E01.370.386.700.650.900 – ventilation-perfusion ratio
- MeSH E01.370.386.700.660 – pulmonary ventilation
- MeSH E01.370.386.700.660.225 – forced expiratory flow rates
- MeSH E01.370.386.700.660.225.500 – maximal expiratory flow rate
- MeSH E01.370.386.700.660.225.505 – maximal expiratory flow-volume curves
- MeSH E01.370.386.700.660.225.510 – maximal midexpiratory flow rate
- MeSH E01.370.386.700.660.225.600 – peak expiratory flow rate
- MeSH E01.370.386.700.660.230 – forced expiratory volume
- MeSH E01.370.386.700.660.500 – maximal voluntary ventilation
- MeSH E01.370.386.700.750 – spirometry
- MeSH E01.370.386.700.750.100 – bronchospirometry
- MeSH E01.370.386.700.950 – valsalva maneuver
- MeSH E01.370.386.700.975 – work of breathing
- MeSH E01.370.386.720 – respiratory sounds
- MeSH E01.370.386.740 – rhinomanometry
- MeSH E01.370.386.870 – rhinometry, acoustic

==== MeSH E01.370.388 – diagnostic techniques, surgical ====
- MeSH E01.370.388.100 – biopsy
- MeSH E01.370.388.100.100 – biopsy, needle
- MeSH E01.370.388.100.100.500 – biopsy, fine-needle
- MeSH E01.370.388.100.150 – chorionic villi sampling
- MeSH E01.370.388.100.160 – conization
- MeSH E01.370.388.100.580 – sentinel lymph node biopsy
- MeSH E01.370.388.250 – endoscopy
- MeSH E01.370.388.250.035 – angioscopy
- MeSH E01.370.388.250.070 – arthroscopy
- MeSH E01.370.388.250.100 – bronchoscopy
- MeSH E01.370.388.250.150 – colposcopy
- MeSH E01.370.388.250.160 – culdoscopy
- MeSH E01.370.388.250.180 – cystoscopy
- MeSH E01.370.388.250.250 – endoscopy, digestive system
- MeSH E01.370.388.250.250.160 – cholangiopancreatography, endoscopic retrograde
- MeSH E01.370.388.250.250.250 – endoscopy, gastrointestinal
- MeSH E01.370.388.250.250.250.160 – colonoscopy
- MeSH E01.370.388.250.250.250.160.800 – sigmoidoscopy
- MeSH E01.370.388.250.250.250.200 – duodenoscopy
- MeSH E01.370.388.250.250.250.320 – gastroscopy
- MeSH E01.370.388.250.250.250.680 – proctoscopy
- MeSH E01.370.388.250.250.260 – esophagoscopy
- MeSH E01.370.388.250.280 – fetoscopy
- MeSH E01.370.388.250.360 – hysteroscopy
- MeSH E01.370.388.250.520 – laparoscopy
- MeSH E01.370.388.250.525 – laryngoscopy
- MeSH E01.370.388.250.560 – mediastinoscopy
- MeSH E01.370.388.250.700 – neuroendoscopy
- MeSH E01.370.388.250.840 – thoracoscopy
- MeSH E01.370.388.250.840.830 – thoracic surgery, video-assisted
- MeSH E01.370.388.250.920 – ureteroscopy
- MeSH E01.370.388.250.950 – video-assisted surgery
- MeSH E01.370.388.250.950.830 – thoracic surgery, video-assisted
- MeSH E01.370.388.600 – pneumomediastinum, diagnostic
- MeSH E01.370.388.605 – pneumoperitoneum, artificial

==== MeSH E01.370.390 – diagnostic techniques, urological ====
- MeSH E01.370.390.050 – antibody-coated bacteria test, urinary
- MeSH E01.370.390.175 – cystoscopy
- MeSH E01.370.390.400 – kidney function tests
- MeSH E01.370.390.400.100 – blood urea nitrogen
- MeSH E01.370.390.400.300 – glomerular filtration rate
- MeSH E01.370.390.400.700 – radioisotope renography
- MeSH E01.370.390.550 – nephrostomy, percutaneous
- MeSH E01.370.390.800 – ureteroscopy
- MeSH E01.370.390.810 – urinalysis
- MeSH E01.370.390.820 – urinary catheterization
- MeSH E01.370.390.830 – urography

==== MeSH E01.370.400 – disability evaluation ====
- MeSH E01.370.400.925 – work capacity evaluation

==== MeSH E01.370.405 – electrodiagnosis ====
- MeSH E01.370.405.240 – electrocardiography
- MeSH E01.370.405.240.100 – body surface potential mapping
- MeSH E01.370.405.240.230 – electrocardiography, ambulatory
- MeSH E01.370.405.240.850 – vectorcardiography
- MeSH E01.370.405.240.850.100 – body surface potential mapping
- MeSH E01.370.405.245 – electroencephalography
- MeSH E01.370.405.245.100 – alpha rhythm
- MeSH E01.370.405.245.125 – beta rhythm
- MeSH E01.370.405.245.150 – cortical synchronization
- MeSH E01.370.405.245.175 – delta rhythm
- MeSH E01.370.405.245.700 – theta rhythm
- MeSH E01.370.405.250 – electrokymography
- MeSH E01.370.405.255 – electromyography
- MeSH E01.370.405.260 – electronystagmography
- MeSH E01.370.405.265 – electrooculography
- MeSH E01.370.405.267 – electrophysiologic techniques, cardiac
- MeSH E01.370.405.270 – electroretinography
- MeSH E01.370.405.610 – plethysmography, impedance

==== MeSH E01.370.475 – kymography ====
- MeSH E01.370.475.200 – electrokymography

==== MeSH E01.370.500 – mass screening ====
- MeSH E01.370.500.174 – anonymous testing
- MeSH E01.370.500.350 – genetic screening
- MeSH E01.370.500.500 – mass chest x-ray
- MeSH E01.370.500.540 – multiphasic screening
- MeSH E01.370.500.580 – neonatal screening

==== MeSH E01.370.510 – medical history taking ====
- MeSH E01.370.510.150 – cornell medical index
- MeSH E01.370.510.700 – reproductive history

==== MeSH E01.370.520 – monitoring, physiologic ====
- MeSH E01.370.520.100 – blood glucose self-monitoring
- MeSH E01.370.520.200 – drug monitoring
- MeSH E01.370.520.215 – esophageal ph monitoring
- MeSH E01.370.520.230 – fetal monitoring
- MeSH E01.370.520.230.150 – cardiotocography
- MeSH E01.370.520.500 – monitoring, ambulatory
- MeSH E01.370.520.500.100 – blood pressure monitoring, ambulatory
- MeSH E01.370.520.500.230 – electrocardiography, ambulatory
- MeSH E01.370.520.500.240 – esophageal ph monitoring
- MeSH E01.370.520.505 – monitoring, immunologic
- MeSH E01.370.520.510 – monitoring, intraoperative
- MeSH E01.370.520.625 – polysomnography
- MeSH E01.370.520.750 – telemetry
- MeSH E01.370.520.860 – uterine monitoring

==== MeSH E01.370.530 – myography ====
- MeSH E01.370.530.255 – electromyography

==== MeSH E01.370.600 – physical examination ====
- MeSH E01.370.600.024 – anthropometry
- MeSH E01.370.600.024.250 – cephalometry
- MeSH E01.370.600.024.650 – odontometry
- MeSH E01.370.600.024.690 – pelvimetry
- MeSH E01.370.600.050 – apgar score
- MeSH E01.370.600.060 – auscultation
- MeSH E01.370.600.060.400 – heart auscultation
- MeSH E01.370.600.100 – blood pressure determination
- MeSH E01.370.600.115 – body constitution
- MeSH E01.370.600.115.100 – body weights and measures
- MeSH E01.370.600.115.100.062 – body fat distribution
- MeSH E01.370.600.115.100.062.500 – adiposity
- MeSH E01.370.600.115.100.125 – body mass index
- MeSH E01.370.600.115.100.160 – body size
- MeSH E01.370.600.115.100.160.100 – body height
- MeSH E01.370.600.115.100.160.120 – body weight
- MeSH E01.370.600.115.100.160.120.186 – birth weight
- MeSH E01.370.600.115.100.160.120.300 – fetal weight
- MeSH E01.370.600.115.100.160.120.699 – overweight
- MeSH E01.370.600.115.100.160.120.699.500 – obesity
- MeSH E01.370.600.115.100.160.120.699.500.500 – obesity, morbid
- MeSH E01.370.600.115.100.160.120.828 – thinness
- MeSH E01.370.600.115.100.231 – body surface area
- MeSH E01.370.600.115.100.250 – crown-rump length
- MeSH E01.370.600.115.100.660 – organ size
- MeSH E01.370.600.115.100.803 – skinfold thickness
- MeSH E01.370.600.115.100.960 – waist-hip ratio
- MeSH E01.370.600.115.800 – somatotypes
- MeSH E01.370.600.120 – body temperature
- MeSH E01.370.600.225 – facial expression
- MeSH E01.370.600.230 – facies
- MeSH E01.370.600.250 – gait
- MeSH E01.370.600.300 – hand strength
- MeSH E01.370.600.550 – neurologic examination
- MeSH E01.370.600.550.650 – reflex
- MeSH E01.370.600.550.650.650 – reflex, abdominal
- MeSH E01.370.600.550.650.655 – reflex, abnormal
- MeSH E01.370.600.550.650.655.400 – reflex, babinski
- MeSH E01.370.600.550.650.670 – reflex, acoustic
- MeSH E01.370.600.550.650.690 – reflex, pupillary
- MeSH E01.370.600.550.650.700 – reflex, stretch
- MeSH E01.370.600.550.650.800 – startle reaction
- MeSH E01.370.600.600 – palpation
- MeSH E01.370.600.600.500 – digital rectal examination
- MeSH E01.370.600.610 – percussion
- MeSH E01.370.600.620 – pigmentation
- MeSH E01.370.600.620.750 – skin pigmentation
- MeSH E01.370.600.650 – pulse
- MeSH E01.370.600.700 – range of motion, articular
- MeSH E01.370.600.750 – self-examination
- MeSH E01.370.600.750.100 – breast self-examination

==== MeSH E01.370.610 – plethysmography ====
- MeSH E01.370.610.600 – photoplethysmography
- MeSH E01.370.610.610 – plethysmography, impedance
- MeSH E01.370.610.610.200 – cardiography, impedance
- MeSH E01.370.610.615 – plethysmography, whole body

==== MeSH E01.370.750 – skin tests ====
- MeSH E01.370.750.300 – intradermal tests
- MeSH E01.370.750.300.400 – kveim test
- MeSH E01.370.750.300.750 – skin test end-point titration
- MeSH E01.370.750.450 – local lymph node assay
- MeSH E01.370.750.600 – passive cutaneous anaphylaxis
- MeSH E01.370.750.610 – patch tests
- MeSH E01.370.750.800 – tuberculin test

==== MeSH E01.370.760 – speech production measurement ====
- MeSH E01.370.760.760 – speech articulation tests

=== MeSH E01.450 – laboratory techniques and procedures ===
==== MeSH E01.450.150 – clinical chemistry tests ====
- MeSH E01.450.150.100 – blood chemical analysis
- MeSH E01.450.150.100.100 – blood gas analysis
- MeSH E01.450.150.100.100.600 – oximetry
- MeSH E01.450.150.100.100.600.100 – blood gas monitoring, transcutaneous
- MeSH E01.450.150.100.105 – blood glucose self-monitoring
- MeSH E01.450.150.100.110 – blood protein electrophoresis
- MeSH E01.450.150.100.115 – blood urea nitrogen
- MeSH E01.450.150.100.350 – glucose clamp technique
- MeSH E01.450.150.100.355 – glucose tolerance test
- MeSH E01.450.150.100.450 – lactose tolerance test
- MeSH E01.450.150.100.600 – petrosal sinus sampling
- MeSH E01.450.150.200 – enzyme tests
- MeSH E01.450.150.210 – esophageal ph monitoring
- MeSH E01.450.150.300 – gastric acidity determination
- MeSH E01.450.150.470 – limulus test
- MeSH E01.450.150.810 – urinalysis

==== MeSH E01.450.230 – cytodiagnosis ====
- MeSH E01.450.230.050 – amniocentesis
- MeSH E01.450.230.100 – biopsy
- MeSH E01.450.230.100.100 – biopsy, needle
- MeSH E01.450.230.100.100.500 – biopsy, fine-needle
- MeSH E01.450.230.100.150 – chorionic villi sampling
- MeSH E01.450.230.100.160 – conization
- MeSH E01.450.230.100.580 – sentinel lymph node biopsy
- MeSH E01.450.230.150 – chorionic villi sampling
- MeSH E01.450.230.235 – cytopathogenic effect, viral
- MeSH E01.450.230.700 – spinal puncture
- MeSH E01.450.230.900 – vaginal smears

==== MeSH E01.450.375 – hematologic tests ====
- MeSH E01.450.375.107 – blood cell count
- MeSH E01.450.375.107.330 – erythrocyte count
- MeSH E01.450.375.107.330.725 – reticulocyte count
- MeSH E01.450.375.107.595 – leukocyte count
- MeSH E01.450.375.107.595.500 – lymphocyte count
- MeSH E01.450.375.107.595.500.150 – cd4 lymphocyte count
- MeSH E01.450.375.107.595.500.150.160 – cd4-cd8 ratio
- MeSH E01.450.375.107.700 – platelet count
- MeSH E01.450.375.115 – blood coagulation tests
- MeSH E01.450.375.115.320 – international normalized ratio
- MeSH E01.450.375.115.600 – partial thromboplastin time
- MeSH E01.450.375.115.610 – prothrombin time
- MeSH E01.450.375.115.830 – thrombelastography
- MeSH E01.450.375.115.870 – thrombin time
- MeSH E01.450.375.115.950 – whole blood coagulation time
- MeSH E01.450.375.120 – blood grouping and crossmatching
- MeSH E01.450.375.125 – blood sedimentation
- MeSH E01.450.375.135 – bone marrow examination
- MeSH E01.450.375.225 – erythrocyte aggregation
- MeSH E01.450.375.230 – erythrocyte indices
- MeSH E01.450.375.300 – figlu test
- MeSH E01.450.375.400 – hematocrit
- MeSH E01.450.375.410 – hemoglobinometry
- MeSH E01.450.375.550 – osmotic fragility
- MeSH E01.450.375.625 – platelet function tests
- MeSH E01.450.375.625.100 – bleeding time
- MeSH E01.450.375.625.160 – clot retraction
- MeSH E01.450.375.625.625 – platelet count
- MeSH E01.450.375.750 – schilling test

==== MeSH E01.450.495 – immunologic tests ====
- MeSH E01.450.495.100 – basophil degranulation test
- MeSH E01.450.495.150 – cell migration inhibition
- MeSH E01.450.495.160 – cytotoxicity tests, immunologic
- MeSH E01.450.495.160.155 – complement hemolytic activity assay
- MeSH E01.450.495.225 – fluorescent antibody technique
- MeSH E01.450.495.225.050 – antibody-coated bacteria test, urinary
- MeSH E01.450.495.225.225 – fluorescent antibody technique, direct
- MeSH E01.450.495.225.230 – fluorescent antibody technique, indirect
- MeSH E01.450.495.225.240 – fluoroimmunoassay
- MeSH E01.450.495.225.240.225 – fluorescence polarization immunoassay
- MeSH E01.450.495.375 – hemolytic plaque technique
- MeSH E01.450.495.385 – histocompatibility testing
- MeSH E01.450.495.385.120 – blood grouping and crossmatching
- MeSH E01.450.495.385.475 – lymphocyte culture test, mixed
- MeSH E01.450.495.400 – immune adherence reaction
- MeSH E01.450.495.410 – immunoassay
- MeSH E01.450.495.410.320 – immunoblotting
- MeSH E01.450.495.410.320.100 – blotting, western
- MeSH E01.450.495.410.320.100.200 – blotting, far-western
- MeSH E01.450.495.410.350 – immunoenzyme techniques
- MeSH E01.450.495.410.350.200 – enzyme-linked immunosorbent assay
- MeSH E01.450.495.410.350.210 – enzyme multiplied immunoassay technique
- MeSH E01.450.495.410.380 – immunosorbent techniques
- MeSH E01.450.495.410.380.200 – enzyme-linked immunosorbent assay
- MeSH E01.450.495.410.380.810 – radioallergosorbent test
- MeSH E01.450.495.410.380.825 – radioimmunoprecipitation assay
- MeSH E01.450.495.410.380.830 – radioimmunosorbent test
- MeSH E01.450.495.410.700 – radioimmunoassay
- MeSH E01.450.495.410.700.405 – immunoradiometric assay
- MeSH E01.450.495.410.700.810 – radioallergosorbent test
- MeSH E01.450.495.410.700.825 – radioimmunoprecipitation assay
- MeSH E01.450.495.410.700.830 – radioimmunosorbent test
- MeSH E01.450.495.460 – leukocyte adherence inhibition test
- MeSH E01.450.495.505 – monitoring, immunologic
- MeSH E01.450.495.620 – pregnancy tests, immunologic
- MeSH E01.450.495.735 – serologic tests
- MeSH E01.450.495.735.050 – agglutination tests
- MeSH E01.450.495.735.050.375 – hemagglutination tests
- MeSH E01.450.495.735.050.375.150 – coombs test
- MeSH E01.450.495.735.050.450 – latex fixation tests
- MeSH E01.450.495.735.060 – aids serodiagnosis
- MeSH E01.450.495.735.150 – complement fixation tests
- MeSH E01.450.495.735.155 – complement hemolytic activity assay
- MeSH E01.450.495.735.360 – hemadsorption inhibition tests
- MeSH E01.450.495.735.370 – hemagglutination inhibition tests
- MeSH E01.450.495.735.550 – neutralization tests
- MeSH E01.450.495.735.550.750 – skin test end-point titration
- MeSH E01.450.495.735.645 – precipitin tests
- MeSH E01.450.495.735.645.300 – flocculation tests
- MeSH E01.450.495.735.645.350 – immunodiffusion
- MeSH E01.450.495.735.645.350.350 – immunoelectrophoresis
- MeSH E01.450.495.735.645.350.350.150 – counterimmunoelectrophoresis
- MeSH E01.450.495.735.645.350.350.350 – immunoelectrophoresis, two-dimensional
- MeSH E01.450.495.735.830 – radioallergosorbent test
- MeSH E01.450.495.735.840 – radioimmunoprecipitation assay
- MeSH E01.450.495.735.850 – syphilis serodiagnosis
- MeSH E01.450.495.735.850.200 – fluorescent treponemal antibody absorption test
- MeSH E01.450.495.735.850.800 – treponema immobilization test
- MeSH E01.450.495.750 – skin tests
- MeSH E01.450.495.750.300 – intradermal tests
- MeSH E01.450.495.750.300.540 – kveim test
- MeSH E01.450.495.750.300.750 – skin test end-point titration
- MeSH E01.450.495.750.450 – local lymph node assay
- MeSH E01.450.495.750.600 – passive cutaneous anaphylaxis
- MeSH E01.450.495.750.610 – patch tests
- MeSH E01.450.495.750.800 – tuberculin test

==== MeSH E01.450.620 – pregnancy tests ====
- MeSH E01.450.620.620 – pregnancy tests, immunologic

==== MeSH E01.450.865 – specimen handling ====
- MeSH E01.450.865.100 – biopsy
- MeSH E01.450.865.100.100 – biopsy, needle
- MeSH E01.450.865.100.100.500 – biopsy, fine-needle
- MeSH E01.450.865.100.150 – chorionic villi sampling
- MeSH E01.450.865.100.160 – conization
- MeSH E01.450.865.100.580 – sentinel lymph node biopsy
- MeSH E01.450.865.221 – dissection
- MeSH E01.450.865.221.580 – microdissection
- MeSH E01.450.865.366 – preservation, biological
- MeSH E01.450.865.366.156 – cryopreservation
- MeSH E01.450.865.366.156.260 – freeze drying
- MeSH E01.450.865.366.156.260.270 – freeze substitution
- MeSH E01.450.865.366.643 – refrigeration
- MeSH E01.450.865.366.833 – tissue preservation
- MeSH E01.450.865.366.833.230 – blood preservation
- MeSH E01.450.865.366.833.660 – organ preservation
- MeSH E01.450.865.366.833.890 – semen preservation
- MeSH E01.450.865.632 – punctures
- MeSH E01.450.865.632.100 – biopsy, needle
- MeSH E01.450.865.632.150 – blood specimen collection
- MeSH E01.450.865.632.150.150 – cordocentesis
- MeSH E01.450.865.632.150.600 – petrosal sinus sampling
- MeSH E01.450.865.632.150.625 – phlebotomy
- MeSH E01.450.865.632.160 – chorionic villi sampling
- MeSH E01.450.865.632.600 – paracentesis
- MeSH E01.450.865.632.600.620 – pericardiocentesis
- MeSH E01.450.865.632.700 – spinal puncture
- MeSH E01.450.865.820 – tissue and organ harvesting
- MeSH E01.450.865.900 – vaginal smears

=== MeSH E01.789 – prognosis ===
==== MeSH E01.789.800 – treatment outcome ====
- MeSH E01.789.800.760 – treatment failure

The list continues at List of MeSH codes (E02).
