= List of MeSH codes (E02) =

The following is a partial list of the "E" codes for Medical Subject Headings (MeSH), as defined by the United States National Library of Medicine (NLM).

This list continues the information at List of MeSH codes (E01). Codes following these are found at List of MeSH codes (E03). For other MeSH codes, see List of MeSH codes.

The source for this content is the set of 2006 MeSH Trees from the NLM.

== MeSH E02 – therapeutics ==
=== MeSH E02.095 – biological therapy ===
==== MeSH E02.095.135 – blood transfusion ====
- MeSH E02.095.135.140 – blood component transfusion
- MeSH E02.095.135.140.275 – erythrocyte transfusion
- MeSH E02.095.135.140.425 – leukocyte transfusion
- MeSH E02.095.135.140.425.445 – lymphocyte transfusion
- MeSH E02.095.135.140.650 – platelet transfusion
- MeSH E02.095.135.164 – blood transfusion, autologous
- MeSH E02.095.135.264 – blood transfusion, intrauterine
- MeSH E02.095.135.469 – exchange transfusion, whole blood
- MeSH E02.095.135.750 – plasma exchange

==== MeSH E02.095.160 – cytapheresis ====
- MeSH E02.095.160.570 – leukapheresis
- MeSH E02.095.160.790 – plateletpheresis

==== MeSH E02.095.520 – immunotherapy ====
- MeSH E02.095.520.400 – immunization
- MeSH E02.095.520.400.330 – immunization, passive
- MeSH E02.095.520.400.330.050 – adoptive transfer
- MeSH E02.095.520.400.330.050.400 – immunotherapy, adoptive
- MeSH E02.095.520.400.470 – immunization schedule
- MeSH E02.095.520.400.485 – immunization, secondary
- MeSH E02.095.520.400.530 – immunotherapy, active
- MeSH E02.095.520.400.530.890 – vaccination
- MeSH E02.095.520.400.650 – mass immunization
- MeSH E02.095.520.450 – immunosuppression
- MeSH E02.095.520.450.310 – desensitization, immunologic
- MeSH E02.095.520.450.440 – graft enhancement, immunologic
- MeSH E02.095.520.450.521 – lymphocyte depletion
- MeSH E02.095.520.450.800 – transplantation conditioning
- MeSH E02.095.520.750 – radioimmunotherapy

==== MeSH E02.095.682 – organotherapy ====
- MeSH E02.095.682.884 – tissue therapy

=== MeSH E02.120 – blood component removal ===
==== MeSH E02.120.285 – cytapheresis ====
- MeSH E02.120.285.570 – leukapheresis
- MeSH E02.120.285.790 – plateletpheresis

==== MeSH E02.120.527 – leukocyte reduction procedures ====
- MeSH E02.120.527.570 – leukapheresis

=== MeSH E02.148 – catheterization ===
==== MeSH E02.148.050 – angioplasty ====
- MeSH E02.148.050.060 – angioplasty, balloon
- MeSH E02.148.050.060.080 – angioplasty, balloon, laser-assisted
- MeSH E02.148.050.060.100 – angioplasty, transluminal, percutaneous coronary
- MeSH E02.148.050.075 – angioplasty, laser
- MeSH E02.148.050.075.080 – angioplasty, balloon, laser-assisted
- MeSH E02.148.050.120 – atherectomy
- MeSH E02.148.050.120.125 – atherectomy, coronary

==== MeSH E02.148.102 – balloon dilatation ====
- MeSH E02.148.102.060 – angioplasty, balloon
- MeSH E02.148.102.060.080 – angioplasty, balloon, laser-assisted
- MeSH E02.148.102.060.100 – angioplasty, transluminal, percutaneous coronary

==== MeSH E02.148.224 – catheterization, peripheral ====
- MeSH E02.148.224.165 – catheterization, swan-ganz

==== MeSH E02.148.442 – heart catheterization ====
- MeSH E02.148.442.110 – catheter ablation
- MeSH E02.148.442.165 – catheterization, swan-ganz

=== MeSH E02.154 – cautery ===
==== MeSH E02.154.402 – electrocoagulation ====
- MeSH E02.154.402.110 – catheter ablation

=== MeSH E02.183 – clinical protocols ===
==== MeSH E02.183.750 – antineoplastic protocols ====
- MeSH E02.183.750.500 – antineoplastic combined chemotherapy protocols

=== MeSH E02.190 – complementary therapies ===
==== MeSH E02.190.044 – acupuncture therapy ====
- MeSH E02.190.044.080 – acupressure
- MeSH E02.190.044.105 – acupuncture analgesia
- MeSH E02.190.044.133 – acupuncture, ear
- MeSH E02.190.044.244 – electroacupuncture
- MeSH E02.190.044.555 – meridians
- MeSH E02.190.044.555.035 – acupuncture points
- MeSH E02.190.044.588 – moxibustion

==== MeSH E02.190.488 – medicine, traditional ====
- MeSH E02.190.488.505 – medicine, african traditional
- MeSH E02.190.488.510 – medicine, arabic
- MeSH E02.190.488.510.500 – medicine, unani
- MeSH E02.190.488.515 – medicine, ayurvedic
- MeSH E02.190.488.587 – medicine, kampo
- MeSH E02.190.488.660 – medicine, oriental traditional
- MeSH E02.190.488.660.520 – medicine, chinese traditional
- MeSH E02.190.488.660.600 – medicine, kampo
- MeSH E02.190.488.660.800 – medicine, tibetan traditional
- MeSH E02.190.488.830 – shamanism

==== MeSH E02.190.525 – mind-body and relaxation techniques ====
- MeSH E02.190.525.061 – aromatherapy
- MeSH E02.190.525.124 – biofeedback (psychology)
- MeSH E02.190.525.186 – breathing exercises
- MeSH E02.190.525.217 – hypnosis
- MeSH E02.190.525.217.100 – autogenic training
- MeSH E02.190.525.217.771 – suggestion
- MeSH E02.190.525.217.771.100 – autosuggestion
- MeSH E02.190.525.249 – imagery (psychotherapy)
- MeSH E02.190.525.311 – laughter therapy
- MeSH E02.190.525.374 – meditation
- MeSH E02.190.525.500 – mental healing
- MeSH E02.190.525.750 – mind-body relations (metaphysics)
- MeSH E02.190.525.812 – psychophysiology
- MeSH E02.190.525.843 – relaxation
- MeSH E02.190.525.875 – relaxation techniques
- MeSH E02.190.525.890 – tai chi
- MeSH E02.190.525.906 – therapeutic touch
- MeSH E02.190.525.937 – yoga

==== MeSH E02.190.599 – musculoskeletal manipulations ====
- MeSH E02.190.599.186 – kinesiology, applied
- MeSH E02.190.599.233 – manipulation, chiropractic
- MeSH E02.190.599.280 – manipulation, osteopathic
- MeSH E02.190.599.374 – manipulation, spinal
- MeSH E02.190.599.374.500 – manipulation, chiropractic
- MeSH E02.190.599.500 – massage
- MeSH E02.190.599.500.500 – acupressure
- MeSH E02.190.599.750 – myofunctional therapy
- MeSH E02.190.599.875 – relaxation techniques

==== MeSH E02.190.701 – organotherapy ====
- MeSH E02.190.701.884 – tissue therapy

==== MeSH E02.190.755 – phytotherapy ====
- MeSH E02.190.755.100 – aromatherapy
- MeSH E02.190.755.624 – eclecticism, historical

==== MeSH E02.190.888 – sensory art therapies ====
- MeSH E02.190.888.030 – acoustic stimulation
- MeSH E02.190.888.061 – aromatherapy
- MeSH E02.190.888.124 – art therapy
- MeSH E02.190.888.249 – color therapy
- MeSH E02.190.888.374 – dance therapy
- MeSH E02.190.888.500 – music therapy
- MeSH E02.190.888.625 – play therapy
- MeSH E02.190.888.812 – psychodrama
- MeSH E02.190.888.812.653 – role playing

==== MeSH E02.190.901 – spiritual therapies ====
- MeSH E02.190.901.155 – faith healing
- MeSH E02.190.901.249 – homeopathy
- MeSH E02.190.901.411 – magic
- MeSH E02.190.901.433 – medicine, African traditional
- MeSH E02.190.901.455 – meditation
- MeSH E02.190.901.500 – mental healing
- MeSH E02.190.901.650 – occultism
- MeSH E02.190.901.740 – radiesthesia
- MeSH E02.190.901.788 – shamanism
- MeSH E02.190.901.830 – therapeutic touch
- MeSH E02.190.901.968 – witchcraft
- MeSH E02.190.901.984 – yoga

=== MeSH E02.218 – cosmetic techniques ===
==== MeSH E02.218.085 – body modification, non-therapeutic ====
- MeSH E02.218.085.090 – body piercing
- MeSH E02.218.085.170 – circumcision
- MeSH E02.218.085.175 – circumcision, female
- MeSH E02.218.085.840 – tattooing

==== MeSH E02.218.565 – mammaplasty ====
- MeSH E02.218.565.210 – breast implantation

=== MeSH E02.258 – cryotherapy ===
==== MeSH E02.258.750 – hypothermia, induced ====
- MeSH E02.258.750.500 – gastric hypothermia

=== MeSH E02.319 – drug therapy ===
==== MeSH E02.319.077 – antineoplastic protocols ====
- MeSH E02.319.077.500 – antineoplastic combined chemotherapy protocols

==== MeSH E02.319.162 – chemoprevention ====
- MeSH E02.319.162.150 – antibiotic prophylaxis

==== MeSH E02.319.300 – drug delivery systems ====
- MeSH E02.319.300.253 – delayed-action preparations
- MeSH E02.319.300.380 – drug carriers
- MeSH E02.319.300.508 – insulin infusion systems
- MeSH E02.319.300.754 – vehicles

==== MeSH E02.319.310 – drug therapy, combination ====
- MeSH E02.319.310.037 – antineoplastic combined chemotherapy protocols
- MeSH E02.319.310.075 – antiretroviral therapy, highly active

==== MeSH E02.319.452 – hormone replacement therapy ====
- MeSH E02.319.452.150 – estrogen replacement therapy

==== MeSH E02.319.703 – premedication ====
- MeSH E02.319.703.150 – antibiotic prophylaxis

==== MeSH E02.319.913 – thrombolytic therapy ====
- MeSH E02.319.913.500 – hirudin therapy

=== MeSH E02.365 – emergency treatment ===
==== MeSH E02.365.647 – resuscitation ====
- MeSH E02.365.647.110 – cardiopulmonary resuscitation
- MeSH E02.365.647.110.500 – advanced cardiac life support
- MeSH E02.365.647.375 – heart massage
- MeSH E02.365.647.729 – respiration, artificial
- MeSH E02.365.647.740 – resuscitation orders

=== MeSH E02.421 – feeding methods ===
==== MeSH E02.421.505 – parenteral nutrition ====
- MeSH E02.421.505.550 – parenteral nutrition, home
- MeSH E02.421.505.550.565 – parenteral nutrition, home total
- MeSH E02.421.505.575 – parenteral nutrition, total
- MeSH E02.421.505.575.565 – parenteral nutrition, home total

=== MeSH E02.520 – hemostatic techniques ===
==== MeSH E02.520.360 – embolization, therapeutic ====
- MeSH E02.520.360.150 – chemoembolization, therapeutic

=== MeSH E02.565 – hyperthermia, induced ===
==== MeSH E02.565.280 – diathermy ====
- MeSH E02.565.280.853 – short-wave therapy
- MeSH E02.565.280.945 – ultrasonic therapy
- MeSH E02.565.280.945.800 – ultrasound, high-intensity focused, transrectal

=== MeSH E02.642 – nutrition therapy ===
==== MeSH E02.642.249 – diet therapy ====
- MeSH E02.642.249.200 – caloric restriction
- MeSH E02.642.249.257 – diabetic diet
- MeSH E02.642.249.263 – diet, carbohydrate-restricted
- MeSH E02.642.249.266 – diet fads
- MeSH E02.642.249.275 – diet, fat-restricted
- MeSH E02.642.249.330 – diet, protein-restricted
- MeSH E02.642.249.385 – diet, reducing
- MeSH E02.642.249.510 – diet, sodium-restricted

==== MeSH E02.642.500 – nutritional support ====
- MeSH E02.642.500.360 – enteral nutrition
- MeSH E02.642.500.505 – parenteral nutrition
- MeSH E02.642.500.505.550 – parenteral nutrition, home
- MeSH E02.642.500.505.550.565 – parenteral nutrition, home total
- MeSH E02.642.500.505.750 – parenteral nutrition, total
- MeSH E02.642.500.505.750.565 – parenteral nutrition, home total

=== MeSH E02.695 – musculoskeletal manipulations ===
==== MeSH E02.695.199 – exercise therapy ====
- MeSH E02.695.199.500 – motion therapy, continuous passive

==== MeSH E02.695.466 – manipulation, spinal ====
- MeSH E02.695.466.500 – manipulation, chiropractic

==== MeSH E02.695.522 – massage ====
- MeSH E02.695.522.100 – acupressure

=== MeSH E02.760 – patient care ===
==== MeSH E02.760.106 – ambulatory care ====
- MeSH E02.760.106.500 – peritoneal dialysis, continuous ambulatory

==== MeSH E02.760.190 – critical care ====
- MeSH E02.760.190.400 – intensive care
- MeSH E02.760.190.400.405 – intensive care, neonatal

==== MeSH E02.760.400 – hospitalization ====
- MeSH E02.760.400.480 – length of stay
- MeSH E02.760.400.600 – patient admission
- MeSH E02.760.400.610 – patient discharge
- MeSH E02.760.400.620 – patient readmission
- MeSH E02.760.400.630 – patient transfer

==== MeSH E02.760.415 – institutionalization ====
- MeSH E02.760.415.280 – deinstitutionalization

==== MeSH E02.760.611 – nursing care ====
- MeSH E02.760.611.470 – home nursing
- MeSH E02.760.611.470.610 – respite care

==== MeSH E02.760.722 – perioperative care ====
- MeSH E02.760.722.400 – intraoperative care
- MeSH E02.760.722.700 – postoperative care

==== MeSH E02.760.905 – terminal care ====
- MeSH E02.760.905.199 – euthanasia
- MeSH E02.760.905.199.249 – euthanasia, active
- MeSH E02.760.905.199.249.200 – euthanasia, active, voluntary
- MeSH E02.760.905.199.249.750 – euthanasia, animal
- MeSH E02.760.905.199.500 – euthanasia, passive
- MeSH E02.760.905.400 – hospice care
- MeSH E02.760.905.700 – resuscitation orders
- MeSH E02.760.905.850 – suicide, assisted

==== MeSH E02.760.952 – withholding treatment ====
- MeSH E02.760.952.500 – euthanasia, passive

=== MeSH E02.774 – phototherapy ===
==== MeSH E02.774.722 – photochemotherapy ====
- MeSH E02.774.722.435 – hematoporphyrin photoradiation

==== MeSH E02.774.945 – ultraviolet therapy ====
- MeSH E02.774.945.500 – puva therapy
- MeSH E02.774.945.500.500 – photopheresis

=== MeSH E02.779 – physical therapy modalities ===
==== MeSH E02.779.249 – balneology ====
- MeSH E02.779.249.020 – ammotherapy
- MeSH E02.779.249.110 – baths
- MeSH E02.779.249.610 – mud therapy
- MeSH E02.779.249.902 – steam bath

==== MeSH E02.779.468 – electric stimulation therapy ====
- MeSH E02.779.468.399 – electroacupuncture
- MeSH E02.779.468.800 – transcutaneous electric nerve stimulation

==== MeSH E02.779.480 – exercise therapy ====
- MeSH E02.779.480.500 – motion therapy, continuous passive

==== MeSH E02.779.496 – hyperthermia, induced ====
- MeSH E02.779.496.020 – ammotherapy
- MeSH E02.779.496.280 – diathermy
- MeSH E02.779.496.280.853 – short-wave therapy
- MeSH E02.779.496.280.945 – ultrasonic therapy
- MeSH E02.779.496.640 – steam bath

==== MeSH E02.779.735 – musculoskeletal manipulations ====
- MeSH E02.779.735.374 – manipulation, spinal
- MeSH E02.779.735.500 – massage
- MeSH E02.779.735.500.500 – acupressure
- MeSH E02.779.735.875 – relaxation techniques

=== MeSH E02.800 – punctures ===
==== MeSH E02.800.550 – paracentesis ====
- MeSH E02.800.550.620 – pericardiocentesis

==== MeSH E02.800.558 – phlebotomy ====
- MeSH E02.800.558.500 – bloodletting

=== MeSH E02.815 – radiotherapy ===
==== MeSH E02.815.190 – cranial irradiation ====
- MeSH E02.815.190.600 – pituitary irradiation

==== MeSH E02.815.635 – radiotherapy, computer-assisted ====
- MeSH E02.815.635.700 – radiotherapy, conformal
- MeSH E02.815.635.700.700 – radiotherapy, intensity-modulated

==== MeSH E02.815.639 – radiotherapy dosage ====
- MeSH E02.815.639.200 – dose fractionation

==== MeSH E02.815.722 – radiotherapy, high-energy ====
- MeSH E02.815.722.500 – neutron capture therapy
- MeSH E02.815.722.500.100 – boron neutron capture therapy
- MeSH E02.815.722.820 – radioisotope teletherapy

=== MeSH E02.831 – physical rehabilitation ===
==== MeSH E02.831.387 – exercise therapy ====
- MeSH E02.831.387.500 – motion therapy, continuous passive

==== MeSH E02.831.671 – rehabilitation of hearing impaired ====
- MeSH E02.831.671.221 – communication methods, total
- MeSH E02.831.671.432 – lipreading
- MeSH E02.831.671.609 – manual communication
- MeSH E02.831.671.609.668 – sign language

==== MeSH E02.831.727 – rehabilitation of speech and language disorders ====
- MeSH E02.831.727.344 – language therapy
- MeSH E02.831.727.541 – speech, alaryngeal
- MeSH E02.831.727.541.677 – speech, esophageal
- MeSH E02.831.727.552 – speech therapy
- MeSH E02.831.727.862 – voice training

=== MeSH E02.870 – renal replacement therapy ===
==== MeSH E02.870.300 – renal dialysis ====
- MeSH E02.870.300.200 – hemodiafiltration
- MeSH E02.870.300.300 – hemodialysis, home
- MeSH E02.870.300.650 – peritoneal dialysis
- MeSH E02.870.300.650.500 – peritoneal dialysis, continuous ambulatory

==== MeSH E02.870.350 – hemofiltration ====
- MeSH E02.870.350.300 – hemodiafiltration

=== MeSH E02.875 – reproductive techniques ===
==== MeSH E02.875.194 – contraception ====
- MeSH E02.875.194.250 – coitus interruptus
- MeSH E02.875.194.285 – contraception, barrier
- MeSH E02.875.194.300 – contraception, immunologic
- MeSH E02.875.194.540 – contraception, postcoital
- MeSH E02.875.194.605 – natural family planning methods
- MeSH E02.875.194.670 – ovulation inhibition
- MeSH E02.875.194.910 – sterilization, reproductive

==== MeSH E02.875.540 – insemination, artificial ====
- MeSH E02.875.540.515 – insemination, artificial, heterologous
- MeSH E02.875.540.525 – insemination, artificial, homologous

==== MeSH E02.875.800 – reproductive techniques, assisted ====
- MeSH E02.875.800.500 – embryo transfer
- MeSH E02.875.800.750 – fertilization in vitro
- MeSH E02.875.800.750.700 – sperm injections, intracytoplasmic
- MeSH E02.875.800.800 – posthumous conception
- MeSH E02.875.800.875 – gamete intrafallopian transfer
- MeSH E02.875.800.937 – insemination, artificial
- MeSH E02.875.800.937.515 – insemination, artificial, heterologous
- MeSH E02.875.800.937.525 – insemination, artificial, homologous
- MeSH E02.875.800.968 – oocyte donation
- MeSH E02.875.800.984 – ovulation induction
- MeSH E02.875.800.984.500 – superovulation
- MeSH E02.875.800.992 – zygote intrafallopian transfer

=== MeSH E02.880 – respiratory therapy ===
==== MeSH E02.880.690 – oxygen inhalation therapy ====
- MeSH E02.880.690.490 – hyperbaric oxygenation

==== MeSH E02.880.820 – respiration, artificial ====
- MeSH E02.880.820.508 – high-frequency ventilation
- MeSH E02.880.820.508.510 – high-frequency jet ventilation
- MeSH E02.880.820.525 – liquid ventilation
- MeSH E02.880.820.790 – positive-pressure respiration
- MeSH E02.880.820.790.259 – continuous positive airway pressure
- MeSH E02.880.820.790.520 – intermittent positive pressure breathing
- MeSH E02.880.820.790.550 – Intermittent positive pressure ventilation
- MeSH E02.880.820.950 – ventilator weaning

=== MeSH E02.912 – sorption detoxification ===
==== MeSH E02.912.400 – hemofiltration ====
- MeSH E02.912.400.300 – hemodiafiltration

==== MeSH E02.912.800 – renal dialysis ====
- MeSH E02.912.800.200 – hemodiafiltration
- MeSH E02.912.800.300 – hemodialysis, home
- MeSH E02.912.800.650 – peritoneal dialysis
- MeSH E02.912.800.650.500 – peritoneal dialysis, continuous ambulatory

=== MeSH E02.950 – therapy, computer-assisted ===
==== MeSH E02.950.875 – surgery, computer-assisted ====
The list continues at List of MeSH codes (E03).
