= Nasal provocation test =

- Purpose: indicated for help the diagnosis of allergic rhinitis

The Nasal Provocation Test (NPT or nasal challenge test) is a medical procedure indicated for help the diagnosis of allergic rhinitis and nonallergic rhinitis. NPT may be monitored by clinical scores, rhinomanometry, acoustic rhinometry, nasal smear cytology and/or spirometry.
