= Ronald Summers =

Radiologist at the National Institutes of Health

Ronald M. Summers
- Citizenship: USA
- Education: University of Pennsylvania
- Known for: CT Colonography, deep learning in radiology
- Scientific career
- Workplaces: NIH

Ronald Marc Summers is an American radiologist and senior investigator at the Diagnostic Radiology Department at the NIH Clinical Center in Bethesda, Maryland. He is chief of the Clinical Image Processing Service and directs the Imaging Biomarkers and Computer-Aided Diagnosis (CAD) Laboratory. A researcher in the field of radiology and computer-aided diagnosis, he has co-authored over 500 journal articles and conference proceedings papers and is a coinventor on 12 patents. His lab has conducted research applying artificial intelligence and deep learning to radiology.

== Background ==
Summers received his B.A. degree in physics from the University of Pennsylvania in 1981, where he also obtained his M.D. and Ph.D. degrees in Medicine/Anatomy & Cell Biology in 1988. He completed a medical internship at the Penn Presbyterian Medical Center in Philadelphia, Pennsylvania, a radiology residency at the University of Michigan, Ann Arbor, MI (1989–1993) and an MRI fellowship at Duke University, Durham, NC (1993–1994).

== Research ==
Summers' lab is known for developing software for "virtual colonoscopy" and computer aided detection (CAD) algorithms which assist in the detection of colon polyps. His lab is also known for multi-organ multi-atlas registration and the development of large radiologic image databases. Summers is also a practicing clinician – his clinical areas of specialty are thoracic and gastrointestinal radiology and body cross-sectional imaging.

Summers' lab is known for pioneering work in the application of deep learning to problems in medical imaging such as computer aided detection, classification, and segmentation. A February 2016 paper from his lab exploring convolutional neural network architectures and transfer learning for lymph node detection and interstitial lung disease classification had over 1,000 citations as of early 2019. In 2018 he was the keynote speaker at the inaugural Medical Imaging and Deep Learning (MIDL) conference.

In September 2017 his lab released 100,000 anonymized chest x-ray images from 30,000 patients, including many with advanced lung disease.

In July 2018, his lab released DeepLesion, a dataset of 32,000 annotated lesions identified on CT images spread over 4,400 patients. At the 2019 IEEE Symposium on Biomedical Imaging (ISBI) Youbao Tang, a postdoc in Summers' lab, unveiled a universal lesion detector (nicknamed "ULDor") which uses a mask R-CNN architecture to detect many types of lesions throughout the body with high precision.

In 2019 his lab has demonstrated how to generate weak labels from clinically generated medical reports using deep learning and natural language processing techniques, thus greatly reducing the need for burdensome hand annotation of datasets.

Summers and collaborators have also developed a tool for opportunistic fully automated bone mineral density (BMD) measurement in CT scans which has been used to track BMD changes in large longitudinal cohorts. Together with Perry Pickhardt and collaborators, the tool was used to track bone mineral density changes in 20,000 subjects. Summers' lab has also demonstrated the utility of deep learning for performing automated measurement of muscle, liver fat, vertebral levels, and plaque in large datasets. A 2022 paper from Summers' lab published in Radiology showed how computed tomography (CT) biomarkers are associated with diabetes and pre-diabetes.

Summers has served as a member of the editorial boards of the journals Radiology: Artificial Intelligence, Journal of Medical Imaging, and Academic Radiology and is a Fellow of the Society of Abdominal Radiologists and the American Institute for Medical and Biological Engineering (AIMBE).

== Awards ==
- Presidential Early Career Award for Scientists and Engineers, 1999
- NIH Director's Award, 2012
