= Transconvolution =

The term transconvolution designates a numerical method used in medical imaging, in particular emission computed tomography. Transconvolution enables a subsequent manipulation of the Point spread function (PSF) in already recorded images.

Properties of an image such as the spatial resolution or the appearance of small objects are determined by the PSF of the imaging system used for image acquisition. Different imaging systems with different PSFs therefore provide slightly different images of one and the same object.

Starting from known PSFs of different tomographic systems, the transconvolution method allows an image recorded on a particular tomograph to be converted as if it had been acquired by another tomograph. The method can thus ensure the comparability of images that were originally recorded on different systems.

== Definition ==
Given two different tomographs with different point spread functions $psf_1$ and $psf_2$ the imaging process can be defined in terms of convolution as

$$obj * psf_1 = img_1$$

$$obj * psf_2 = img_2$$

with "$*$" representing the convolution operator and $img_1$ and $img_2$ representing the two slightly different images of the same object $obj$ as seen by the respective tomographs.

The two equations yield the relationship

$$img_1 * psf_1^{-1} * psf_2 = img_2$$

with $psf_1^{-1}$ representing the inverse function of the according point spread function $psf_1$.

The inverse point spreading function $psf_1^{-1}$ diverges and can not be determined or handled numerically. But, within certain boundary conditions, the complete term $psf_1^{-1} * psf_2$ is approximately computable by numerical methods.

The transconvolution function $tf$ is defined as

$$tf = psf_1^{-1} * psf_2$$

which results in the formula

$$img_1 * tf = img_2$$

With the PSFs of the respective tomographs known, it is thus possible to convert an image $img_1$ recorded by the first tomograph into an $img_2$ emulating an image as recorded by the second tomograph. Of course, the method is subject to certain limits, in particular the computed $img_2$ can not represent spatial frequencies not captured to at least some degree by $psf_1$. Consequently, the spatial resolution of an image can not be increased arbitrarily.

== Application in medical imaging ==
The second point spread function $psf_2$ does not have to represent a real tomograph, but can be purposely defined to represent a virtual tomograph with corresponding properties. Based on the definition of a standardized virtual tomograph and the determination of the imaging properties of different real tomographs, the transconvolution method allows a uniform and quantitatively comparable representation of the image data taken by the different tomographs or systems, as if all measurements were made consistently by the standardized virtual system. The method thus supports quantitative comparisons of images taken by different imaging systems and in particular by different clinical tomographs.

Another application of the transconvolution method in positron emission tomography allows to handle the diverse image blur caused by the according diverse positron range of the actual positron emitting radionuclide. In particular this allows to use differing radionuclides for calibration as opposed to the subsequent imaging.

== Literature ==
- T. Weitzel, F. Corminboeuf, B. Klaeser, T Krause: "Kreuzkalibrierung von Positronen-Emissions-Tomographen für multizentrische Studien: Festkörper-Phantom und Transconvolution." In: Bulletin der Schweizerische Gesellschaft für Strahlenbiologie und Medizinische Physik. Oct. 2010, S. 9ff. SGSMP-Bulletin 72
- T. Weitzel, F. Corminboeuf, B. Klaeser, T. Krause, T Beyer: "Transconvolution and virtual PET: A new concept for quantification of PET in multi-center trials." In: Journal of Nuclear Medicine. 51, 2010, S. 115.
- G. A. Prenosil, T. Weitzel, M. Hentschel, B. Klaeser, T. Krause: "Transconvolution and the virtual positron emission tomograph–a new method for cross calibration in quantitative PET/CT imaging." In: Medical physics. Vol 40, No. 6, June 2013, S. 062503, doi:10.1118/1.4805112, PMID 23718608.
- G. A. Prenosil, M. Hentschel, M. Fürstner, T. Krause, T. Weitzel, B. Klaeser: "Technical Note: Transconvolution based equalization of positron energy effects for the use of 68Ge/68Ga phantoms in determining 18F PET recovery." In: Medical Physics., 44, 2017 S. 3761
