= Viatronix =

Viatronix, Inc.
- Type: Private
- Founded: 2000
- Headquarters: Stony Brook, NY, USA
- Key people: Zaffar Hayat (President & CEO)
- Products: V3D-Colon, V3D-Explorer, V3D-Vascular, V3D-Calcium Scoring, V3D-Cardiac

Viatronix, Inc. (known as Viatronix) is a creator and researcher of clinical applications software for radiology, focusing on virtual colonoscopy. It is a corporation based in Stony Brook, New York, United States.

== Products ==
The company is known for products that provide data for work in radiology. Its most widely known product is V3D‑Colon, a software system that provides virtual colonoscopy. Comparative evaluations note V3D‑Colon’s 3D rendering and navigation capabilities.

The system received FDA 510(k) clearance in November 2000 and additional clearance for marketing as a screening tool in April 2002. V3D‑Explorer is a general 3D package for visualizing and analyzing CT, MR, PET and other images. Beyond virtual colonoscopy, the company provides V3D‑Vascular (tools for detecting, visualizing, and quantifying vascular structures), V3D‑Calcium Scoring (for quantifying calcified coronary plaques relevant to coronary artery disease), and V3D‑Cardiac (visualization and quantification of coronary and left ventricular structures and function from computed tomography angiography, CTA).

The V3D‑Cardiac module received FDA 510(k) market clearance in December 2008. Viatronix and its products have been recognized in the medical imaging sector, including a Frost & Sullivan European Medical Imaging Emerging Company of the Year Award in 2009.
