= Scorotron =

Device for creating corona discharge current

A scorotron (from screen controlled corona), also called a corona grid, is a device which creates corona discharge current, used in xerography. Scorotrons appear in photocopiers, in xeroradiography equipment, and similar applications.
