= Xeroradiography =

- MeSH: D014986

Xeroradiography is a type of X-ray imaging in which a picture of the body is recorded on paper rather than on film. In this technique, a plate of selenium, which rests on a thin layer of aluminium oxide, is charged uniformly by passing it in front of a scorotron. The process was developed by engineer Dr. Robert C. McMaster in 1950.

As X-ray photon impinges on this amorphous coat of selenium, charges diffuse out, in proportion to energy content of the X-ray. This occurs as a result of photoconduction. The resulting imprint, in the form of charge distribution on the plate, attracts toner particles, which is then transferred to reusable paper plates. In contrast to conventional X-rays, photographic developers are not needed. Hence the term xeroradiography; 'xero' meaning dry in Greek. It requires more radiation exposure. Historically used in mammography prior to the advent of digital mammography.

Xeromammography is a form of xeroradiography.
