= Xeromammography =

Xeroradiography for breast imaging

- ICD-9-CM: 87.36
- MeSH: D014984

Xeromammography is a photoelectric method of recording an x-ray image on a coated metal plate, using low-energy photon beams, long exposure time, and dry chemical developers.

It is a form of xeroradiography.

This process was developed in the late 1960s by Jerry Hedstrom. In 1966, Dr. John N. Wolfe presented extensive clinical data on the technique, which led the American College of Radiology to initiate advanced research and established xeromammography as a clinical standard by the early 1980s.

The downsides to xeromammography included a higher radiation dose; clinical studies found the average absorbed dose to be approximately 4–5 mGy per image, which is roughly double the dose of modern digital mammography, and the process required the use of blue toner powder which was prone to leaking, creating significant maintenance issues and a messy clinical environment.
