= Rhinomanometry =

Method used in evaluation of respiratory function of the nasal cavity

- ICD-9-CM: 89.12
- MeSH: D025363
- OPS-301 code: 1-245

Rhinomanometry is a form of manometry used in evaluation of the nasal cavity. Rhinomanometry is a standard diagnostic tool aiming to objectively evaluate the respiratory function of the nose. It measures pressure and flow during normal inspiration and expiration through the nose. Increased pressure during respiration is a result of increased resistance to airflow through nasal passages (nasal blockage), while increased flow, which means the speed of airstream, is related to better patency. Nasal obstruction leads to increased values of nasal resistance. Rhinomanometry may be used to measure only one nostril at a time (anterior rhinomanometry) or both nostrils simultaneously (posterior rhinomanometry).

In anterior rhinomanometry, the patient is asked to blow his nose, sit in an upright position, and the pressure sensing tube is placed in one nostril, while the contralateral nostril is left opened. The patient places a mask which is connected to the device tightly onto his face. Unilateral measurements are performed to detect any asymmetry or abnormality in nasal airway resistance. When the measurements are performed before and after the application of a nasal decongestant spray, the differences in resistance can be attributed to nasal mucosal congestion. If there is no significant improvement after decongestant, anatomical abnormality, like deformity of cartilage or bone within nasal cavity is suspected. However, such measurements allow only to detect in which side of the nose there is obstruction, not the location within the nasal cavity, which can be detected by acoustic rhinometry or endoscopy. Anterior rhinomanometry is more commonly used and it is often recommended for its easy technique. However, it should be stressed that controlled ambient temperature and humidity, tight seal of the facial mask, contralateral nostril closure and prevention of mouth breathing are essential for reproducible results. Patients' complaints of nasal obstruction are not always confirmed by these objective measurements. Posterior rhinomanometry should be done by more experienced technicians and very good collaboration of the patient is essential.

Rhinomanometry can be used to test nasal patency in basal conditions in order to differentiate between anatomical and mucosal abnormalities by performing a test with a decongestant. It can also be used to check impact of other treatments, like nasal steroid sprays, on objective nasal blockage. It is also used in challenge tests with allergen when nasal patency is measured before and after application of allergen onto the nasal mucosa. Increased resistance on rhinomanometry after allergen application is an objective mean in proving allergy to airborne allergens when other allergy tests fail.
