= Echoencephalography =

- Specialty: Neurology
- ICD-9-CM: 88.71
- MeSH: D004453

Echoencephalography is a medical imaging technique used to examine the brain by means of ultrasonic waves.

== See also ==
- Electroencephalography (EEG)
- Magnetoencephalography (MEG)
- Tomography
- Medical ultrasonography
- Echocardiography, magnetocardiography (MCG), and electrocardiography (ECG or EKG), for diagnosing heart problems
