= Radioimmunodetection =

- Purpose: radio imaging technique

Radioimmunodetection is an imaging technique using radiolabeled antibodies.
