= Portography =

Radiography of the portal vein after injection of radioopaque contrast material

- ICD-9-CM: 88.64
- MeSH: D011172

Portography is a radiography of the portal vein after injection of radioopaque contrast material.
