= Neuronavigation =

Set of computer-assisted technologies

- MeSH: D038361

Neuronavigation is the set of computer-assisted technologies used by neurosurgeons to guide or "navigate" within the confines of the skull or vertebral column during surgery, and used by psychiatrists to accurately target rTMS (transcranial magnetic stimulation). The set of hardware for these purposes is referred to as a neuronavigator.

== Stereotactic surgery ==
Neuronavigation is recognized as the next evolutionary step of stereotactic surgery, a set of techniques that dates back to the early 1900s and that gained popularity during the 1940s, particularly in Germany, France and the U.S., with the development of surgery for the treatment of movement disorders such as Parkinson's disease and dystonias. In its infancy the purpose of this technology was to create a mathematical model describing a proposed coordinate system for the space within a closed structure, e.g., the skull. This "fiducial spatial coordinate system” uses fiducial markers as a reference to describe with high accuracy the position of specific structures within this arbitrarily defined space. The surgeon then refers to that data to target particular structures within the brain. This technology was boosted by the collection of data on human anatomy in “stereotactic atlases”, expanding the quantitatively defined “targets” that could be readily used in surgery. Finally, the advent of modern neuro-imaging technologies such as computed tomography (CT) and magnetic resonance imaging (MRI)—along with the ever-increasing capabilities of digitalization, computer-graphic modelling and accelerated manipulation of data through complex mathematical algorithms via robust computer technologies—made possible the real-time quantitative spatial fusion of images of the patient's brain with the created “fiducial coordinate system” for the purpose of guiding the surgeon's instrument or probe to a selected target. In this way the observations done via highly sophisticated neuro-imaging technologies (CT, MRI, angiography) are related to the actual patient during surgery.

== Neuro imaging ==
The ability to relate the position of a real surgical instrument in the surgeon's hand or the microscope's focal point to the location of the imaged pathology, updated in "real time" in an "integrated operating room", highlights the modern version of this set of technologies. In its current form, neuronavigation began in the 1990s and has adapted to new neuro-imaging technologies, real-time imaging capabilities, new technologies to transfer the information in the operating room for 3-D localization, real-time neuro-monitoring, robotics, and new and better algorithms to handle data via more sophisticated computer technology.

== Surgical virtualization ==
In its later conceptualization, the term neuronavigation has started to overlap with surgical-virtualization in which a neurosurgeon is able to visualize the scenario for surgery in a 3-D model of manipulable computer data. In this way the physician can "practice and check" the surgery, try alternative approaches, assess possible difficulties, etc., before the real surgery takes place.

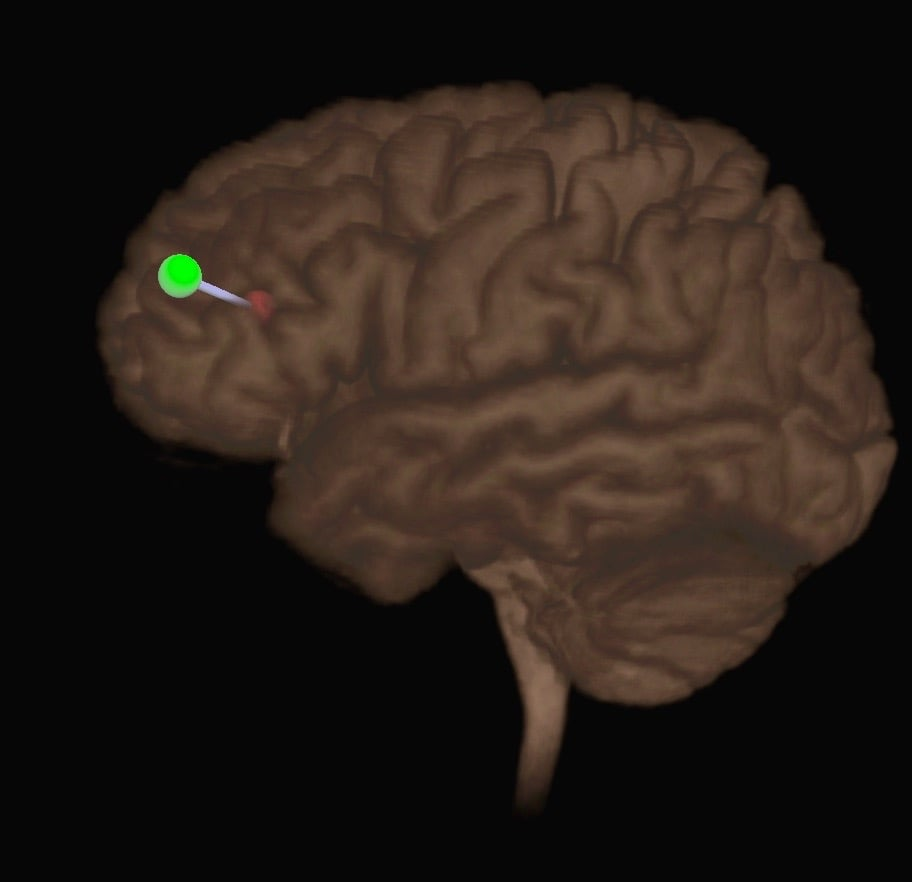
Left Dorsolateral Prefrontal Cortex targeted using high definition MRI. The red sphere is the anterior inferior left DLPFC, the green sphere is the indicated coil location. Left DLPFC is stimulated for the treatment of depression and other conditions

== Neuronavigation for transcranial magnetic stimulation ==
The standard TMS protocol which was FDA approved in 2008 estimates the location of the DLPFC by finding the left motor cortex and marking a spot 5 cm anterior to it. Later two more methods were introduced using measurements of the head and calculating the location of the DLPFC as 1) the F3 (EEG 10/20 system) or 2) the Beam method. Both were estimations with some limitations. With the introduction of Neuronavigation, direct visualization of structures can be achieved either with an individual's (specially ordered) MRI or an average brain (MNI) stretched to the dimensions of the individual. There is now greater significance of this increased accuracy due to recent evidence that stimulation of the gyral crown is less effective than stimulation of the sulcal bank. The introduction of robotic controlled TMS also may make Neuronavigation more important. Several manufacturers offer complete systems including Ant Neuro or Axilum Robotics.

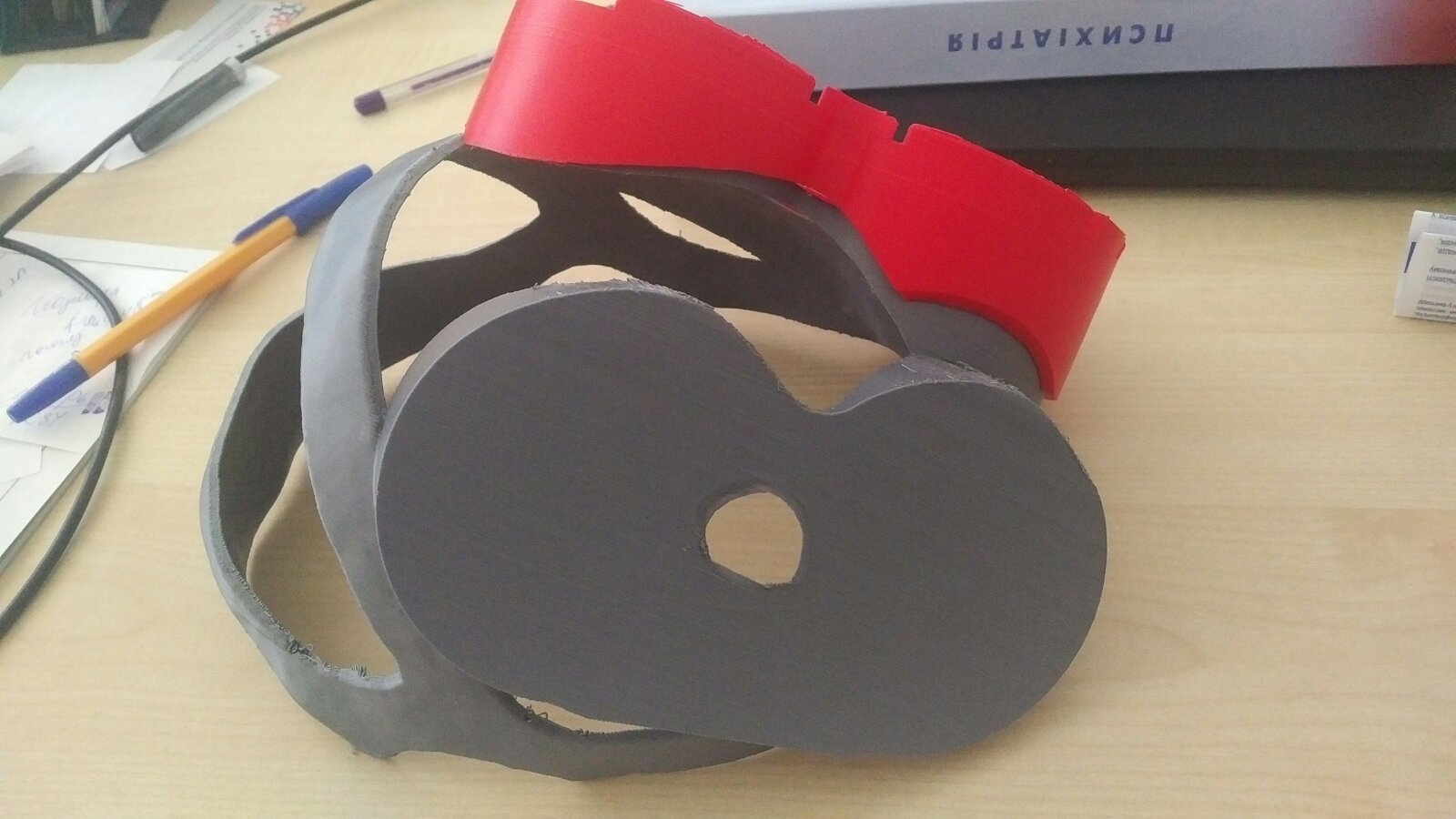
3d printed transcranial magnetic stimulation patient-specific guide based on MRI data capable to hold 2 Magventure MCF-B65 coils in selected regions on both frontal lobes.

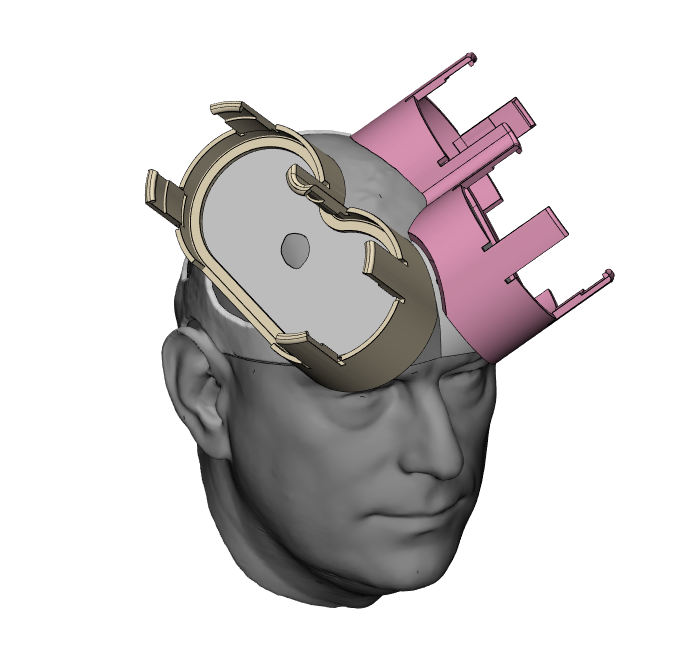
CAD model of patient-specific TMS guide

== Neuronavigation for spine surgery ==
Assistive technologies are used during spinal fusion surgery to increase accuracy, especially for the placement of pedicle screws. A review of navigation techniques for spine surgery published in 2019 listed four currently available options:

- Medtronic stealth system
- BrainLab
- Stryker navigation
- 7D Surgical system
