= Intermittent positive pressure breathing =

- Other names: Intermittent Positive Pressure Ventilation
- Specialty: Pulmonology

Intermittent positive pressure breathing (IPPB) is a respiratory therapy treatment for people who are hypoventilating or have cystic fibrosis. While not a preferred method due to cost, IPPB is used to expand the lungs, deliver aerosol medications, and in some circumstances ventilate the patient. There are also IPPB machines used to assist in breathing.

== Indications ==
IPPB may be indicated for patients who are at risk for developing atelectasis and who are unable or unwilling to breathe deeply without assistance. In patients with severe lung hyperinflation, IPPB may decrease dyspnea and discomfort during nebulized therapy.

== Contraindications ==
Most contraindications are relative, such as nausea, hemodynamic instability, tracheal fistula, singulation and hemoptysis. Untreated tension pneumothorax is an absolute contraindication.

When treating atelectasis:

1. Therapy should be volume-oriented
2. Tidal volumes must be measured
3. VT goals must be set (e.g. VT goal of 10-15mL/kg of body weight).
4. Pressure can be increased to reach VT goal if tolerated by patient.

When treating atelectasis, IPPB is only useful if the volume delivered exceeds those volumes achieved by the patient's efforts.
