= Hematopoietic stem cell mobilization =

Hematopoietic stem cell (HSC) mobilization is the medical process of stimulating hematopoietic stem cells to move (or "mobilize") from their native microenvironment ("niche") in the bone marrow into the peripheral bloodstream. Once circulating in sufficient numbers, these cells can be collected via a procedure called leukapheresis and used for hematopoietic stem cell transplantation (HSCT).

This pharmacological approach has largely supplanted the surgical harvesting of bone marrow as the primary method for obtaining stem cells for both autologous and allogeneic transplantation due to its lower invasiveness and often higher cell yields. The success of mobilization hinges on therapeutically disrupting the molecular interactions that anchor HSCs within the bone marrow niche.

== Background ==
Under normal physiological conditions, HSCs reside in a specialized, supportive microenvironment within the bone marrow known as the HSC niche. This niche maintains the long-term viability, quiescence, and self-renewal capacity of the stem cell pool. The retention of HSCs within this niche is an active process mediated by a complex network of cellular and molecular interactions, often described as "molecular tethers". The two most critical retention axes are the CXCR-4/CXCL-12 and VLA-4/VCAM-1 axis.

=== CXCR-4/CXCL-12 axis (CXR-4/SDF-1 axis) ===
The CXCR-4/CXCL-12 axis is a polyfunctional signaling cascade associated with multiple cellular processes such as proliferation, migration, and stress resistance. CXCR-4 (C-X-C chemokine receptor type 4), also known as fusin or CD184, is a seven-transmembrane G-protein coupled receptor (GPCR) located on the surface of HSCs and various other cell types. CXCL-12 (C-X-C motif chemokine 12), also known by SDF-1 (Stromal Cell-Derived Factor-1) is a chemokine protein ubiquitously expressed in many tissues and cell types. The primary retention signal is orchestrated by CXCR4, expressed on the HSC surface, and CXCL12, which is secreted at high concentrations by niche stromal cells like CXCL12-abundant reticular (CAR) cells and osteoblasts. This creates a powerful chemoattractant gradient that not only guides HSC homing but also actively retains them within this microenvironment. Upon binding, the CXCL12/CXCR4 interaction initiates a Gαi-mediated intracellular cascade that suppresses cyclic AMP (cAMP) levels to promote HSC quiescence, while simultaneously activating pathways like PI3K/Akt/mTOR and pERK/MAPK.

=== VLA-4/VCAM-1 axis ===
Working in concert is the physical anchor provided by the VLA-4/VCAM-1 axis. The heterodimeric integrin VLA-4 (α4β1) is expressed on HSCs, while its ligand, VCAM-1 (Vascular Cell Adhesion Molecule-1), is present on stromal and endothelial cells. VLA-4 exists in a default low-affinity state until activation. The intracellular signals emanating from CXCL12 engagement with CXCR4 trigger a process known as "inside-out signaling," which induces a conformational change in VLA-4, shifting it to a high-affinity state capable of binding VCAM-1 tightly. This creates a robust physical tether, anchoring the HSC to the niche architecture, and ensures stable HSC engraftment and quiescence. Other supporting interactions, such as the binding of Stem Cell Factor (SCF) to its receptor c-Kit on HSCs, also contribute to retention and survival. Consequently, the therapeutic disruption of these axes—for instance, by protease-mediated cleavage of both CXCL-12 and VCAM-1 following G-CSF administration—forms the fundamental basis of all modern HSC mobilization strategies.

== Mechanisms of pharmacological mobilization ==
=== Granulocyte colony-stimulating factor (G-CSF) ===
Granulocyte colony-stimulating factor (G-CSF), in forms like filgrastim and lenograstim, is the most common mobilizing agent. G-CSF activates and induces the production of mature neutrophils, promotes the proliferation and differentiation of hematopoietic stem and progenitor cells (HSPCs), and facilitates the release of HSPCs from the bone marrow. Donors are given a course of GCSF prior to stem cell collection. Peak peripheral HSC concentration typically occurs 4–6 days after initiating daily G-CSF injections. G-CSF is also administered prophylactically to prevent neutropenia in patients undergoing chemotherapy.

The exact mechanism by which G-CSF acts to mobilize HSPCs remains unclear, with some studies showing a direct stimulation of stem cells and others suggesting that myeloid cells are required. Neutrophils play a pivotal role in G-CSF-induced HSPC mobilization, as depletion of neutrophils using antibodies against Gr1 significantly reduces HSPC mobilization by G-CSF. Mature neutrophils secrete matrix metalloproteinases (MMPs) into the bone marrow, thereby creating a proteolytic environment which disrupts HSPC retention signaling molecules, such as CXCL12/CXCR4 or VCAM1, in the bone marrow niche and releases HSPCs. However, studies in mice lacking neutrophil proteases have shown that HSPC mobilization can still occur in the absence of MMPs, indicating that MMPs may not be strictly required. The significance of neutrophils in HSPC mobilization was later called into question by a study demonstrating that transgenic mice expressing G-CSF receptors exclusively in the monocytic lineage - but not in neutrophils - were still capable of effective HSPC mobilization. Endosteal macrophages, in particular, are known to regulate osteoblast function, thereby maintaining the integrity of the bone marrow microenvironment. While macrophage depletion appears to enhance HSPC mobilization, other studies have shown that macrophage activation and expansion can also promote LECT2-dependent HSC mobilization, indicating more complex mechanisms.

=== CXCR4 antagonists (Plerixafor) ===
Plerixafor (AMD3100) is an immunostimulant used to mobilize hematopoietic stem cells. Plerixafor acts as an antagonist (or perhaps more accurately a partial agonist) of CXCR4 and an allosteric agonist of CXCR7. Its effect is much faster than G-CSF, with peripheral HSC counts peaking approximately 10–14 hours after a single subcutaneous injection.

=== Chemotherapy-Based Mobilization ===
In the autologous transplant setting (e.g., for multiple myeloma or lymphoma), myelosuppressive chemotherapy (e.g., high-dose cyclophosphamide) can be used as a mobilizing agent, often supplemented with G-CSF.

== Collection ==
The success of mobilization is tracked by measuring the concentration of HSCs in the peripheral blood. This is achieved via flow cytometry to quantify CD34+ cells. CD34 is a surface glycoprotein expressed on HSCs and early progenitor cells, serving as the universal clinical marker. A peripheral blood CD34+ count exceeding a certain threshold typically indicates readiness for collection.
