= Vectorcardiography =

Cardiac assessment method

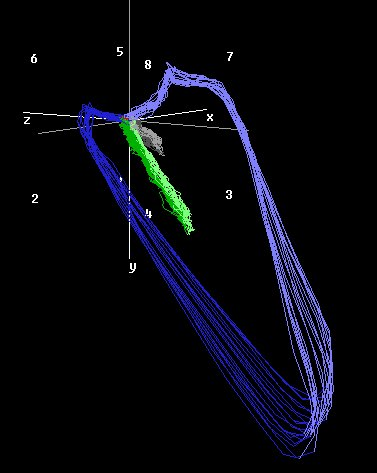
- Normal vectorcardiogram
- ICD-9-CM: 89.53
- MeSH: D014672

Vectorcardiography (VCG) is a method of recording the magnitude and direction of the electrical forces that are generated by the heart by means of a continuous series of vectors that form curving lines around a central point.

Vectorcardiography was developed by Ernest Frank in the mid 1950s. Since the human body is a three-dimensional structure, the basic idea is to construct three orthogonal leads containing all the electric information. The three leads are represented by right-left axis (X), head-to-feet axis (Y) and front-back (anteroposterior) axis (Z).

To calculate Frank's leads X, Y and Z using the standard leads system, the following expressions are used:

$$\begin{align}
X &= -(-0.172 V1 - 0.074 V2 + 0.122 V3 + 0.231 V4 + 0.239 V5 + 0.194 V6 + 0.156 DI - 0.010 DII), &(1)\\
Y &= (0.057 V1 - 0.019 V2 - 0.106 V3 - 0.022 V4 + 0.041 V5 + 0.048 V6 - 0.227 DI + 0.887 DII), &(2)\\
Z &= -(-0.229 V1 - 0.310 V2 - 0.246 V3 - 0.063 V4 + 0.055 V5 + 0.108 V6 + 0.022 DI + 0.102 DII). &(3)\\
\end{align}$$

Researchers have developed various methods of evaluating vectorcardiograms. Grygoriy Risman presents these different methods, which were developed over half a century and which offer an advanced approach called spatial vectorcardiometry (SVCM). The original Russian thesis is filed in the Odesa National Medical University. Recently, Bipolar Precordial Leads exploring the right to left axis combined with averaged unipolar precordial leads allowed to produce sectorial VCG loops in the horizontal plane.

== Spatial QRS-T angle ==
The spatial QRS-T angle (SA) is derived from a vectorcardiogram, which is a three-dimensional representation of the 12-lead electrocardiogram (ECG) created with a computerized matrix operation. The SA is the angle of deviation between two vectors; the spatial QRS-axis representing all of the electrical forces produced by ventricular depolarization and the spatial T-axis representing all the electrical forces produced by ventricular repolarization. The SA is indicative of the difference in orientation between the ventricular depolarization and repolarization sequence.

In healthy individuals, the direction of ventricular depolarization and repolarization is relatively reversed; this creates a sharp SA. There is high individual variability and gender difference in the magnitude of the SA. The mean, normal SA in healthy young adult females and males is 66° and 80°, respectively, and very similar magnitudes are found in the elderly population (65 years and older). In ECG analysis, the SA is categorized into normal (below 105°), borderline abnormal (105–135°) and abnormal (greater than 135°). A broad SA results when the heart undergoes pathological changes and is reflected in a discordant ECG. A large SA indicates an altered ventricular repolarization sequence, and may be the result of structural and functional myocardial changes that induce regional shortening in action potential duration and impaired ion channel functioning.

Current standard ECG markers of repolarization abnormalities include ST depression, T wave inversion and QT prolongation. Many studies have investigated the prognostic strength of the SA for cardiac morbidity and mortality compared to these and other ECG parameters. In treated hypertensive patients, the SA was significantly larger in patients with elevated blood pressure compared to those with lower blood pressure values and a discrimination between patients with high and low blood pressure could not be detected using other ECG parameters. In the Rotterdam Study with men and women aged 55 years and older, having an abnormal SA significantly increased the hazard ratios for cardiac death, sudden cardiac death, non-fatal cardiac events (infarction, coronary interventions) and total mortality. Independently, the SA was a stronger risk indicator of cardiac mortality compared to the other cardiovascular and ECG risk factors analyzed. The Women's Health Initiative study concluded that a wide SA was the strongest predictor for incident coronary heart failure risk and a dominant risk factor for all cause mortality compared to several other ECG parameters. The SA also increases accuracy of diagnosing left ventricular hypertrophy (LVH). Using only conventional ECG criteria to diagnose LVH the diagnostic accuracy was 57%, however the inclusion of the SA significantly improved the diagnostic accuracy to 79%.

The SA is not routinely measured in clinical ECG examination even though the computerized vectorcardiography software is widely available, efficient and is not affected by observational biases unlike other ECG parameters. The SA is a sensitive marker of repolarization aberrations and with further research support the SA will likely become clinically applied in predicting cardiac morbidity and mortality.

A simplified criteria in using the vectorcardiogram has the ability to identify patients with a diaphragmatic infarction not apparent in the electrocardiogram.

== See also ==
- Electrocardiography
