= Impedance cardiography =

- Specialty: Cardiology
- MeSH: D002307

Impedance cardiography (ICG; also called electrical impedance plethysmography, EIP, or thoracic electrical bioimpedance, TEB) is a non-invasive technology measuring total electrical conductivity of the thorax and its changes over time. ICG continuously processes a number of cardiodynamic parameters, such as stroke volume (SV), heart rate (HR), cardiac output (CO), ventricular ejection time (VET), and pre-ejection period; it then detects the impedance changes caused by a high-frequency, low magnitude current flowing through the thorax between additional two pairs of electrodes located outside of the measured segment. The sensing electrodes also detect the ECG signal, which is used as a timing clock of the system.

== Introduction ==
Impedance cardiography has been researched since the 1940s. NASA helped develop the technology in the 1960s. The use of impedance cardiography in psychophysiological research was pioneered by the publication of an article by Miller and Horvath in 1978. Subsequently, the recommendations of Miller and Horvath were confirmed by a standards group in 1990. A comprehensive list of references is available at ICG Publications. With ICG, the placement of four dual disposable sensors on the neck and chest are used to transmit and detect electrical and impedance changes in the thorax, which are used to measure and calculate cardiodynamic parameters.

== Process ==
- Four pairs of electrodes are placed at the neck and the diaphragm level, delineating the thorax
- High frequency, low magnitude current is transmitted through the chest in a direction parallel with the spine from the set of outside pairs
- Current seeks path of least resistance: the blood filled aorta (the systolic phase signal) and both vena cava superior and inferior (the diastolic phase signal, mostly related to respiration)
- The inside pairs, placed at the anatomic landmarks delineating thorax, sense the impedance signals and the ECG signal
- ICG measures the baseline impedance (resistance) to this current
- With each heartbeat, blood volume and velocity in the aorta change
- ICG measures the corresponding change in impedance and its timing
- ICG attributes the changes in impedance to (a) the volumetric expansion of the aorta (this is the main difference between ICG and electrical cardiometry) and (b) to the blood velocity-caused alignment of erythrocytes as a function of blood velocity
- ICG uses the baseline and changes in impedance to measure and calculate hemodynamic parameters

== Hemodynamics ==
Hemodynamics is a subchapter of cardiovascular physiology, which is concerned with the forces generated by the heart and the resulting motion of blood through the cardiovascular system. These forces demonstrate themselves to the clinician as paired values of blood flow and blood pressure measured simultaneously at the output node of the left heart. Hemodynamics is a fluidic counterpart to the Ohm's law in electronics: pressure is equivalent to voltage, flow to current, vascular resistance to electrical resistance and myocardial work to power.

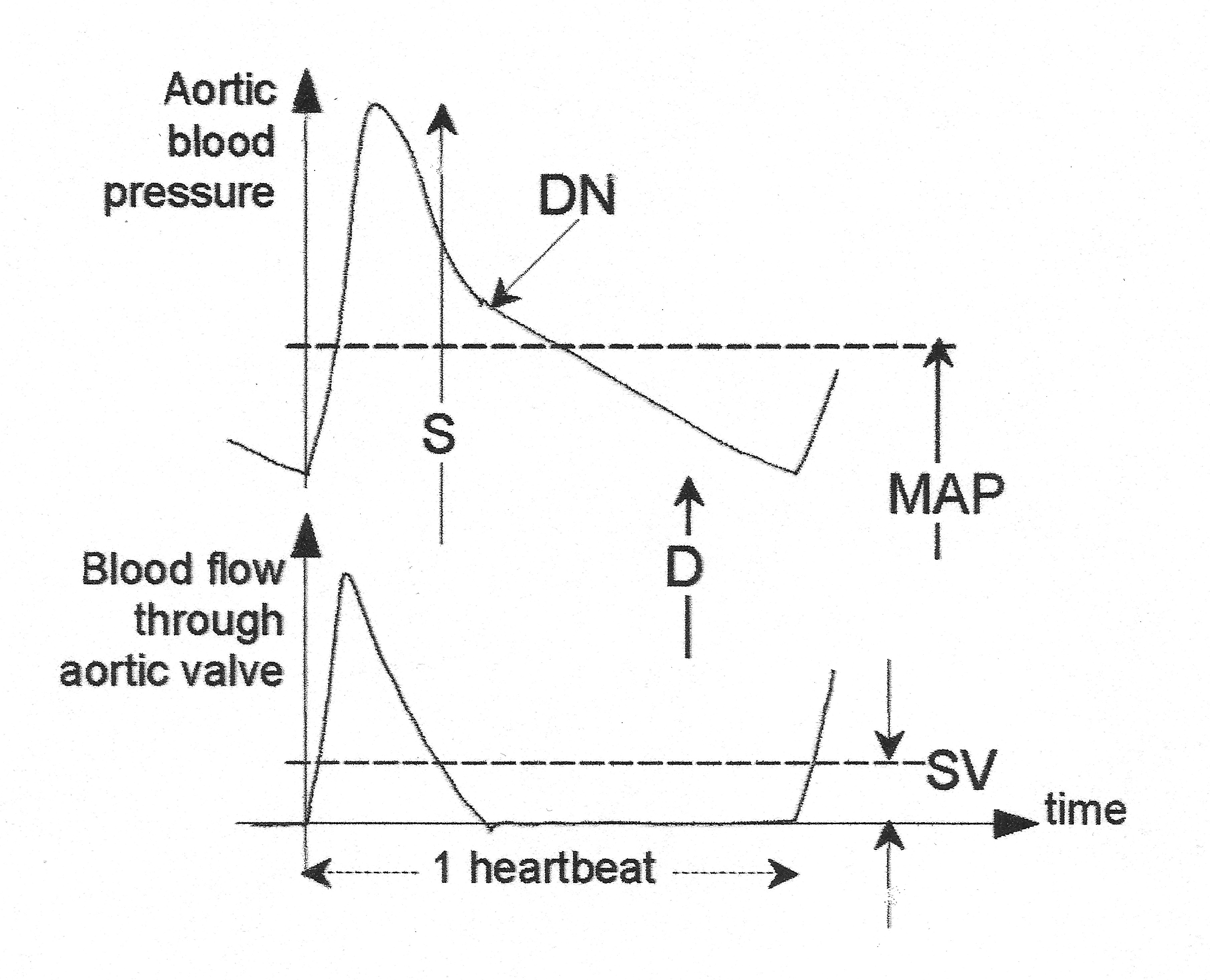
Fig.1: Aortic blood pressure and aortic blood flow over one heartbeat interval: S = Systolic blood pressure; D = Diastolic blood pressure; MAP = Mean Arterial Pressure; SV = Stroke Volume; DN = dicrotic notch (aortic valve closure)

The relationship between the instantaneous values of aortic blood pressure and blood flow through the aortic valve over one heartbeat interval and their mean values are depicted in Fig.1. Their instantaneous values may be used in research; in clinical practice, their mean values, MAP and SV, are adequate.

=== Blood flow parameters ===
Systemic (global) blood flow parameters are (a) the blood flow per heartbeat, the Stroke Volume, SV [ml/beat], and (b) the blood flow per minute, the Cardiac Output, CO [l/min]. There is clear relationship between these blood flow parameters: CO_{[l/min]} = (SV_{[ml]} × HR_{[bpm]})/1000 {Eq.1} where HR is the Heart Rate frequency (beats per minute, bpm).

Since the normal value of CO is proportional to body mass it has to perfuse, one "normal" value of SV and CO for all adults cannot exist. All blood flow parameters have to be indexed. The accepted convention is to index them by the Body Surface Area, BSA [m^{2}], by DuBois & DuBois Formula, a function of height and weight:

BSA_{[m^{2}]} = W^{0.425}_{[kg]} × H^{0.725}_{[cm]} × 0.007184 {Eq.2}

The resulting indexed parameters are Stroke Index, SI (ml/beat/m^{2}) defined as SI_{[ml/beat/m^{2}]} = SV_{[ml]}/BSA_{[m^{2}]} {Eq.3}

and Cardiac Index, CI (l/min/m^{2}), defined as CI_{[l/min/m^{2}]} = CO_{[l/min]}/BSA_{[m^{2}]} {Eq.4}

These indexed blood flow parameters exhibit typical ranges:

For the Stroke Index: 35 < SI_{typical} < 65 ml/beat/m^{2}; for the Cardiac Index: 2.8 < CI_{typical} < 4.2 l/min/m^{2}.

Eq.1 for indexed parameters then changes to CI_{[l/min/m^{2}]} = (SI_{[ml/beat/m^{2}]} × HR_{[bpm]})/1000 {Eq.1a}

=== Oxygen transport ===
The primary function of the cardiovascular system is transport of oxygen: blood is the vehicle, oxygen is the cargo. The task of the healthy cardiovascular system is to provide adequate perfusion to all organs and to maintain a dynamic equilibrium between oxygen demand and oxygen delivery. In a healthy person, the cardiovascular system always increases blood flow in response to increased oxygen demand. In a hemodynamically compromised person, when the system is unable to satisfy increased oxygen demand, the blood flow to organs lower on the oxygen delivery priority list is reduced and these organs may, eventually, fail. Digestive disorders, male impotence, tiredness, sleepwalking, environmental temperature intolerance, are classic examples of a low-flow-state, resulting in reduced blood flow.

=== Modulators ===
SI variability and MAP variability are accomplished through activity of hemodynamic modulators.

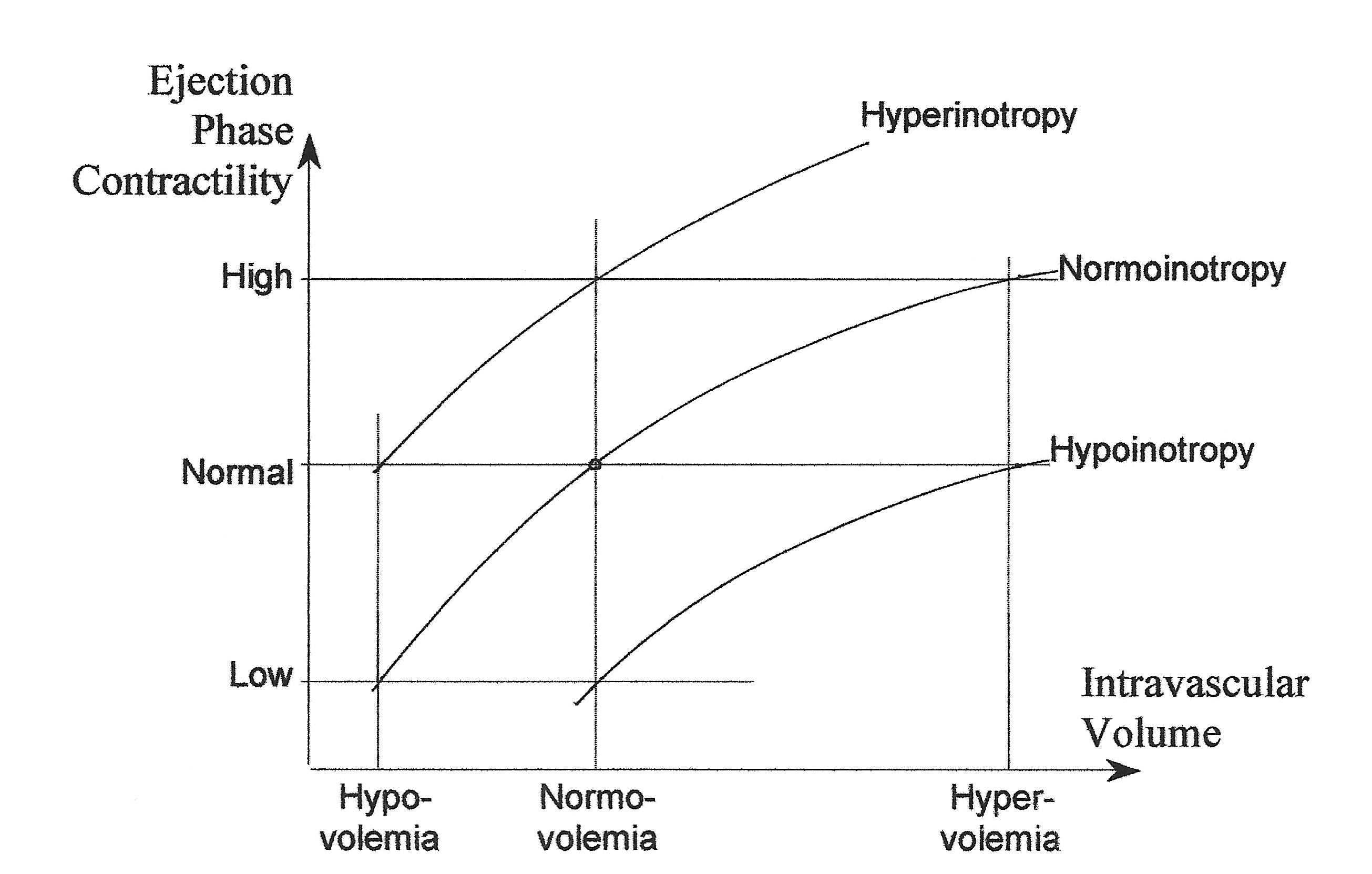
Fig.5: The Frank-Starling Law and Inotropy: Three Frank-Starling curves shown for normoinotropy, hyperinotropy and hypoinotropy. A patient, who is normovolemic and normoinotropic, exhibits normal level of Ejection Phase Contractility (EPC). However, a patient who is hypovolemic can exhibit the same normal level of EPC if given positive inotropes, and a patient who is volume overloaded (hypervolemic) can also have normal level of EPC if given negative inotropes

The conventional cardiovascular physiology terms for the hemodynamic modulators are preload, contractility and afterload. They deal with (a) the inertial filling forces of blood return into the atrium (preload), which stretch the myocardial fibers, thus storing energy in them, (b) the force by which the heart muscle fibers shorten thus releasing the energy stored in them in order to expel part of blood in the ventricle into the vasculature (contractility), and (c) the forces the pump has to overcome in order to deliver a bolus of blood into the aorta per each contraction (afterload). The level of preload is currently assessed either from the PAOP (pulmonary artery occluded pressure) in a catheterized patient, or from EDI (end-diastolic index) by use of ultrasound. Contractility is not routinely assessed; quite often inotropy and contractility are interchanged as equal terms. Afterload is assessed from the SVRI value.

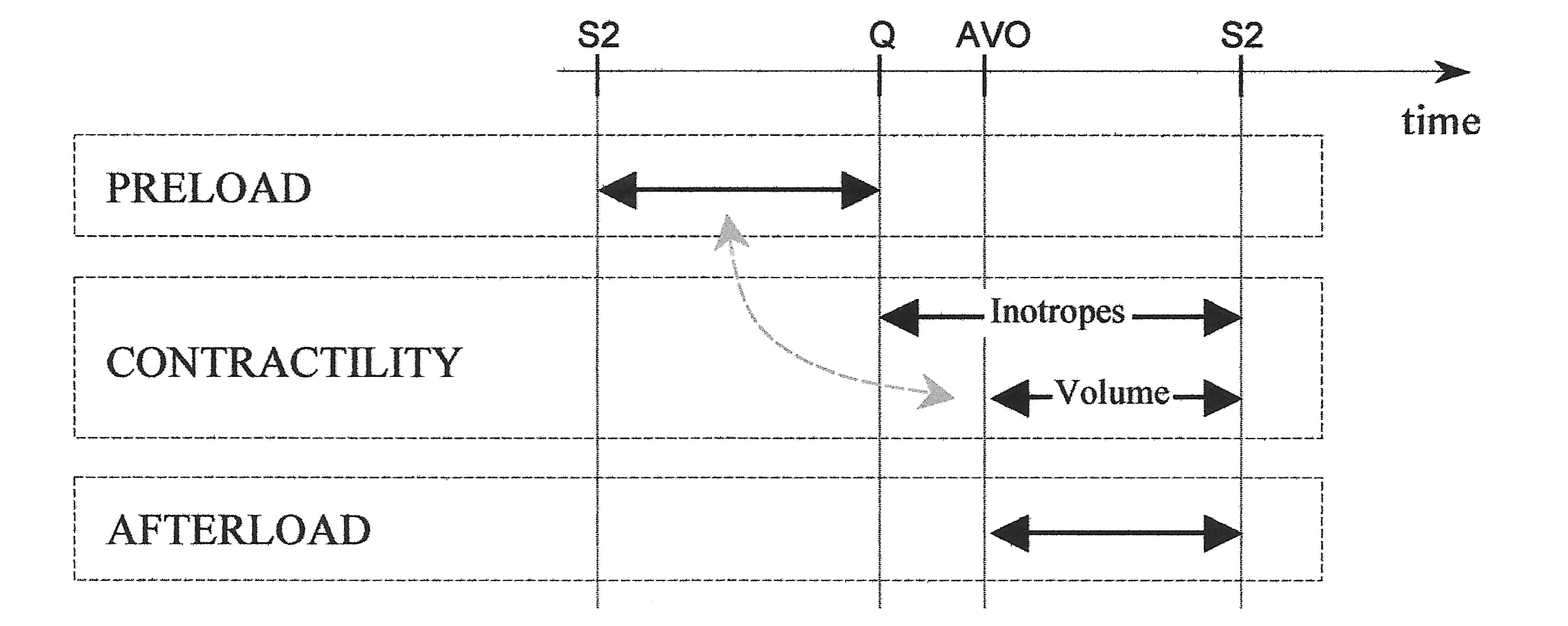
Fig.6: Timing considerations of working effects of preload, contractility (pharmacological = inotropes, and mechanical = Frank-Starling mechanism, i.e., effects of intravascular volume) and afterload in respect to Systolic and Diastolic Time Intervals: Diastole => Starts at S2-time, ends at Q-time. Systole => Isovolumic phase starts at Q-time, ends at AVO-time; Ejection phase starts at AVO-time, ends at S2-time. (S2 = 2nd heart sound = aortic valve closure; AVO = aortic valve opening)

Rather than using the terms preload, contractility and afterload, the preferential terminology and methodology in per-beat hemodynamics is to use the terms for actual hemodynamic modulating tools, which either the body utilizes or the clinician has in his toolbox to control the hemodynamic state:

The preload and the Frank-Starling (mechanically)-induced level of contractility is modulated by variation of intravascular volume (volume expansion or volume reduction/diuresis).

Pharmacological modulation of contractility is performed with cardioactive inotropic agents (positive or negative inotropes) being present in the blood stream and affecting the rate of contraction of myocardial fibers.

The afterload is modulated by varying the caliber of sphincters at the input and output of each organ, thus the vascular resistance, with the vasoactive pharmacological agents (vasoconstrictors or vasodilators and/or ACE Inhibitors and/or ARBs) (ACE = Angiotensin-converting-enzyme; ARB = Angiotensin-receptor-blocker). Afterload also increases with increasing blood viscosity, however, with the exception of extremely hemodiluted or hemoconcentrated patients, this parameter is not routinely considered in clinical practice.

With the exception of volume expansion, which can be accomplished only by physical means (intravenous or oral intake of fluids), all other hemodynamic modulating tools are pharmacological, cardioactive or vasoactive agents.

The measurement of CI and its derivatives allow clinicians to make timely patient assessment, diagnosis, prognosis, and treatment decisions. It has been well established that both trained and untrained physicians alike are unable to estimate cardiac output through physical assessment alone.

=== Invasive monitoring ===
Clinical measurement of cardiac output has been available since the 1970s. However, this blood flow measurement is highly invasive, utilizing a flow-directed, thermodilution catheter (also known as the Swan-Ganz catheter), which represents significant risks to the patient. In addition, this technique is costly (several hundred dollars per procedure) and requires a skilled physician and a sterile environment for catheter insertion. As a result, it has been used only in very narrow strata (less than 2%) of critically ill and high-risk patients in whom the knowledge of blood flow and oxygen transport outweighed the risks of the method. In the United States, it is estimated that at least two million pulmonary artery catheter monitoring procedures are performed annually, most often in peri-operative cardiac and vascular surgical patients, decompensated heart failure, multi-organ failure, and trauma.

=== Noninvasive monitoring ===
In theory, a noninvasive way to monitor hemodynamics would provide exceptional clinical value because data similar to invasive hemodynamic monitoring methods could be obtained with much lower cost and no risk. While noninvasive hemodynamic monitoring can be used in patients who previously required an invasive procedure, the largest impact can be made in patients and care environments where invasive hemodynamic monitoring was neither possible nor worth the risk or cost. Because of its safety and low cost, the applicability of vital hemodynamic measurements could be extended to significantly more patients, including outpatients with chronic diseases. ICG has even been used in extreme conditions such as outer space and a Mt. Everest expedition. Heart failure, hypertension, pacemaker, and dyspnea patients are four conditions in which outpatient noninvasive hemodynamic monitoring can play an important role in the assessment, diagnosis, prognosis, and treatment. Some studies have shown ICG cardiac output is accurate, while other studies have shown it is inaccurate. Use of ICG has been shown to improve blood pressure control in resistant hypertension when used by both specialists and general practitioners. ICG has also been shown to predict worsening status in heart failure.

== ICG parameters ==
The electrical and impedance signals are processed to determine fiducial points, which are then utilized to measure and calculate hemodynamic parameters, such as cardiac output, stroke volume, systemic vascular resistance, thoracic fluid content, acceleration index, and systolic time ratio.

Parameter	Definition
Heart Rate	Number of heart beats each minute
Cardiac Output	Amount of blood pumped by the left ventricle each minute
Cardiac Index	Cardiac output normalized for body surface area
Stroke Volume	Amount of blood pumped by the left ventricle each heartbeat
Stroke Index	Stroke volume normalized for body surface area
Systemic Vascular Resistance	The resistance to the flow of blood in the vasculature (often referred to as "Afterload")
Systemic Vascular Resistance Index	Systemic vascular resistance normalized for body surface area
Acceleration Index	Peak acceleration of blood flow in the aorta
Velocity Index	Peak velocity of blood flow in the aorta
Thoracic Fluid Content	The electrical conductivity of the chest cavity, which is primarily determined by the intravascular, intraalveolar, and interstitial fluids in the thorax
Left Cardiac Work	An indicator of the amount of work the left ventricle must perform to pump blood each minute
Left Cardiac Work Index	Left cardiac work normalized for body surface area
Systolic Time Ratio	The ratio of the electrical and mechanical systole
Pre Ejection Period	The time interval from the beginning of electrical stimulation of the ventricles to the opening of the aortic valve (electrical systole)
Left Ventricular Ejection Time	The time interval from the opening to the closing of the aortic valve (mechanical systole)
