= Bronchography =

- MeSH: D001995
- OPS-301 code: 3-135

Bronchography is a radiological technique, which involves x-raying the respiratory tree after coating the airways with contrast. Bronchography is rarely performed, as it has been made obsolete with improvements in computed tomography and bronchoscopy.
