= Emission computed tomography =

Type of tomography

- ICD-9-CM: 92.0-92.1
- MeSH: D014055
- OPS-301 code: 3-72-3-75

Emission computed tomography (ECT) is a type of tomography involving radioactive or emissions. Types include positron emission tomography (PET) and Single-photon emission computed tomography (SPECT).

SPECT is commonly used to diagnose certain diseases. SPECT imaging is conducting by injecting a radioactive probe (or tracer) into the person's blood stream. A 3-dimensional image is produced using cameras that can image radioactive substances as the tracer is absorbed by specific types of body tissue. This type of imaging can sometimes allow the team to gain more information about the function of certain body tissues to help diagnose certain medical conditions.

PET imaging has applications for treating and diagnosing cancer. PET is often conducted by having the person consume a drink that includes radioactive isotopes or by having the isotopes injected into a person's bloodstream. These isotopes are absorbed by different tissues in the body, including malignant tumour cells, and PET imaging can visualize the function or detect tumour cells by visualizing how the isotopes are processed by different cell types and how they decay. This technique may be used to detect tumours because tumour cells sometime process the isotopes differently.

The imaging agent used in SPECT emits gamma rays, as opposed to the positron emitters (such as ^{18}F) used in PET. There are a range of radiotracers (such as ^{99m}Tc, ^{111}In, ^{123}I, ^{201}Tl) that can be used, depending on the specific application.
