= Acoustic rhinometry =

- MeSH: D023842

Acoustic rhinometry is a diagnostic measurement of cross sectional area and length of the nose and the nasal cavity through acoustic reflections. It can be used to measure nasal anatomical landmarks, and nasal airway changes in response to allergen provocation tests. The size and the pattern of the reflected sound waves provide information on the structure and dimensions of the nasal cavity, with the time delay of reflections correlating with the distance from the nostril.

== Method ==
The test is carried out by generating an acoustic pulse from a speaker or spark source and this sound pulse is transmitted to the nose along a tube. This sound pulse is reflected back to a microphone and this reflection is generated according to the changes in the local acoustic impedance related to cross-sectional area of the nasal cavity. The microphone transmits the sound signal to an amplifier and to a computer which processes it into an area distance graph.

These measurements correlate well with area measurements done by CT scans and nasal airway resistance measured by rhinomanometry, but they are sometimes unreliable in the posterior area and when the nasal area is congested.

== Advantages ==
The main advantage of this procedure is that it is non-invasive providing a measure of nasal cross-sectional area with the length of the nasal passage in real time data. This can be done in the office, operating room, or hospital. This cross-sectional area can also be expressed as nasal volume along the nasal passage from the inferior turbinate to the 7 cm area of the nose before the merging of the two nasal passages into one.

== Normal values ==
Minimum cross-sectional area of nasal passage within normal levels is 0.7 cm^{2} which ranges around 0.3-1.2 cm^{2}. During decongestion it can increase to around 0.5-1.3 cm^{2}. Accuracy of this method is dependent on the interface between the nose and the equipment. Mispositioning of the tube or air leaks can cause results to vary.
