= Virtual colonoscopy =

Medical imaging of the colon

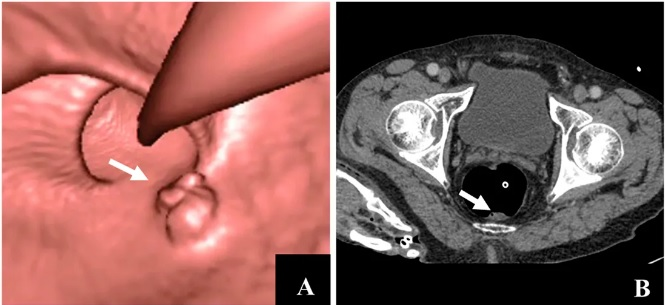
- CT colonography of a rectal mass. Left image is a volume rendering and right image is a thin slice. It also shows the rectal tube used for insufflation of gas to distend the colon.
- MeSH: D023881
- MedlinePlus: 007253

Virtual colonoscopy (VC, also called CT colonography or CT pneumocolon) is the use of CT scanning or magnetic resonance imaging (MRI) to produce two- and three-dimensional images of the colon (large intestine), from the lowest part, the rectum, to the lower end of the small intestine, and to display the images on an electronic display device. The procedure is used to screen for colon cancer and polyps, and may detect diverticulosis. A virtual colonoscopy can provide 3D reconstructed endoluminal views of the bowel. VC provides a secondary benefit of revealing diseases or abnormalities outside the colon.

== Procedure ==
This video shows a virtual colonoscopy of the rectosigmoid colon performed in a retrograde fashion. There is a 10-mm colonoscopically-proven polyp in the sigmoid colon seen at the top of the frame at the midpoint of the movie. The movie concludes at the tip of the rectal tube which was used to insufflate the colon.

While preparations for VC vary, the patient will usually be asked to take laxatives or other oral agents at home the day before the procedure to clear stool from the colon. A suppository is also used to cleanse the rectum of any remaining fecal matter. The patient may also be given a solution designed to coat any residual faeces which may not have been cleared by the laxative, called 'faecal tagging'. This allows the physician (usually a consultant radiologist), viewing the 3D images to effectively subtract the left-over faeces, which may otherwise give false positive results.

VC takes place in the radiology department of a hospital or medical center. The examination takes about 10 minutes and does not require sedatives.

During the procedure:

- The patient is placed in a supine position on the examination table
- The patient may be given a dosage of Butylscopolamine intravenously to minimize muscle activity in the area.
- A thin tube is inserted into the rectum, so that air can be pumped through the tube in order to inflate the colon for better viewing.
- The table moves through the scanner to produce a series of two-dimensional cross-sections along the length of the colon. A computer program puts these images together to create a three-dimensional picture that can be viewed on the video screen.
- The patient is asked to hold his/her breath during the scan to avoid distortion on the images.
- The scan is then repeated with the patient lying in a prone position.

After the examination, the images produced by the scanner must be processed into a 3D image, +/- a fly through (a cine program which allows the user move through the bowel as if performing a normal colonoscopy). A radiologist evaluates the results to identify any abnormalities.

The patient may resume normal activity after the procedure, but if abnormalities are found and the patient needs conventional colonoscopy, it may be performed the same day.

== Advantages ==
VC may be more comfortable for some individuals, as it does not require the use of a colonoscope. As a result, no sedation is needed, and the patient can return to his/her usual activities or go home after the procedure without the aid of another person. The lack of sedation also lowers the risk of the procedure since some people may have adverse reactions to sedative medications used during conventional colonoscopy. VC provides clearer, more detailed images than a conventional x-ray using a barium enema, sometimes called a lower gastrointestinal (GI) series. Further, about 1 in 10 patients will not have a complete right colon (cecum) evaluation completed with conventional colonoscopy. It also takes less time than either a conventional colonoscopy or a lower GI series.

VC provides a secondary benefit of revealing diseases or abnormalities outside the colon. One study of asymptomatic adults undergoing routine VC found that approximately one unsuspected extracolonic cancer was detected per 300 screenings in addition to about one invasive colorectal cancer per 500 screenings, for an overall rate of approximately one unsuspected cancer of any type detected per 200 screenings. Invasive colorectal cancer was the most common malignancy detected, followed by renal cell carcinoma.

== Disadvantages ==
During virtual colonoscopy, it is not possible to take tissue samples (biopsy) or remove polyps, so a conventional colonoscopy must be performed if abnormalities are found. Also, VC does not show as much detail as a conventional colonoscopy, so polyps smaller than between 2 and 10 millimeters in diameter may not show up on the images. Furthermore virtual colonoscopy performed with CT exposes the patient to ionizing radiation, on the order of a milligray. Some research has demonstrated that ultra-low dose VC can be just as effective in demonstrating bowel disease due to the great difference in x-ray absorption between air and the tissue comprising the inner wall of the colon. Optical colonoscopy is taken as the "gold standard" for colorectal cancer screening by the vast majority of the medical and research communities. However, some radiologists recommend VC as a preferred approach to colorectal screening. Virtual colonoscopy is favored by some professionals because it permits complete visualization of the entire colon, hence providing more opportunity to identify precancerous polyps and cancer, and to then do prompt diagnostic biopsies or therapeutic removal of these lesions.

== Alternatives ==
MRI colonography (MRC) allows similar visualizing without radiation exposure. It can detect larger adenomas and neoplasia with high specificity, but less sensitivity than conventional colonoscopy.
