= List of MeSH codes (E04) =

The following is a partial list of the "E" codes for Medical Subject Headings (MeSH), as defined by the United States National Library of Medicine (NLM).

This list continues the information at List of MeSH codes (E03). Codes following these are found at List of MeSH codes (E05). For other MeSH codes, see List of MeSH codes.

The source for this content is the set of 2006 MeSH Trees from the NLM.

== MeSH E04 – surgical procedures, operative ==
=== MeSH E04.035 – anastomosis, surgical ===
- MeSH E04.035.070 – anastomosis, roux-en-y
- MeSH E04.035.087 – arteriovenous shunt, surgical
- MeSH E04.035.188 – cerebrospinal fluid shunts
- MeSH E04.035.188.850 – ventriculoperitoneal shunt
- MeSH E04.035.188.957 – ventriculostomy
- MeSH E04.035.195 – cholecystostomy
- MeSH E04.035.200 – choledochostomy
- MeSH E04.035.335 – endolymphatic shunt
- MeSH E04.035.398 – gastroenterostomy
- MeSH E04.035.398.385 – gastric bypass
- MeSH E04.035.410 – heart bypass, right
- MeSH E04.035.410.295 – fontan procedure
- MeSH E04.035.415 – jejunoileal bypass
- MeSH E04.035.703 – pancreaticojejunostomy
- MeSH E04.035.720 – pericardial window techniques
- MeSH E04.035.735 – peritoneovenous shunt
- MeSH E04.035.760 – portasystemic shunt, surgical
- MeSH E04.035.760.755 – portacaval shunt, surgical
- MeSH E04.035.760.795 – portasystemic shunt, transjugular intrahepatic
- MeSH E04.035.760.835 – splenorenal shunt, surgical
- MeSH E04.035.775 – portoenterostomy, hepatic
- MeSH E04.035.832 – salpingostomy
- MeSH E04.035.956 – vasovasostomy

=== MeSH E04.050 – assisted circulation ===
- MeSH E04.050.215 – counterpulsation
- MeSH E04.050.215.400 – intra-aortic balloon pumping
- MeSH E04.050.430 – heart-assist devices

=== MeSH E04.062 – bariatric surgery ===
- MeSH E04.062.249 – gastric bypass
- MeSH E04.062.750 – gastroplasty
- MeSH E04.062.875 – jejunoileal bypass
- MeSH E04.062.937 – lipectomy

=== MeSH E04.074 – biopsy ===
- MeSH E04.074.119 – biopsy, needle
- MeSH E04.074.119.500 – biopsy, fine-needle
- MeSH E04.074.160 – conization
- MeSH E04.074.580 – sentinel lymph node biopsy

=== MeSH E04.085 – body modification, non-therapeutic ===
- MeSH E04.085.090 – body piercing
- MeSH E04.085.170 – circumcision
- MeSH E04.085.175 – circumcision, female
- MeSH E04.085.840 – tattooing

=== MeSH E04.100 – cardiovascular surgical procedures ===
- MeSH E04.100.376 – cardiac surgical procedures
- MeSH E04.100.376.125 – cardiomyoplasty
- MeSH E04.100.376.374 – heart arrest, induced
- MeSH E04.100.376.374.500 – circulatory arrest, deep hypothermia induced
- MeSH E04.100.376.410 – heart bypass, right
- MeSH E04.100.376.410.295 – fontan procedure
- MeSH E04.100.376.458 – heart massage
- MeSH E04.100.376.475 – heart transplantation
- MeSH E04.100.376.475.450 – heart-lung transplantation
- MeSH E04.100.376.485 – heart valve prosthesis implantation
- MeSH E04.100.376.719 – myocardial revascularization
- MeSH E04.100.376.719.100 – angioplasty, transluminal, percutaneous coronary
- MeSH E04.100.376.719.125 – atherectomy, coronary
- MeSH E04.100.376.719.332 – coronary artery bypass
- MeSH E04.100.376.719.332.199 – coronary artery bypass, off-pump
- MeSH E04.100.376.719.332.400 – internal mammary-coronary artery anastomosis
- MeSH E04.100.376.730 – pericardial window techniques
- MeSH E04.100.376.735 – pericardiectomy
- MeSH E04.100.376.745 – pericardiocentesis
- MeSH E04.100.700 – reperfusion
- MeSH E04.100.700.600 – myocardial reperfusion
- MeSH E04.100.814 – vascular surgical procedures
- MeSH E04.100.814.050 – angioplasty
- MeSH E04.100.814.050.060 – angioplasty, balloon
- MeSH E04.100.814.050.060.080 – angioplasty, balloon, laser-assisted
- MeSH E04.100.814.050.060.100 – angioplasty, transluminal, percutaneous coronary
- MeSH E04.100.814.050.075 – angioplasty, laser
- MeSH E04.100.814.050.075.080 – angioplasty, balloon, laser-assisted
- MeSH E04.100.814.050.120 – atherectomy
- MeSH E04.100.814.050.120.125 – atherectomy, coronary
- MeSH E04.100.814.055 – angioscopy
- MeSH E04.100.814.143 – arteriovenous shunt, surgical
- MeSH E04.100.814.200 – blood vessel prosthesis implantation
- MeSH E04.100.814.300 – cerebral revascularization
- MeSH E04.100.814.445 – embolectomy
- MeSH E04.100.814.456 – endarterectomy
- MeSH E04.100.814.456.250 – endarterectomy, carotid
- MeSH E04.100.814.603 – limb salvage
- MeSH E04.100.814.750 – peritoneovenous shunt
- MeSH E04.100.814.790 – portasystemic shunt, surgical
- MeSH E04.100.814.790.790 – portacaval shunt, surgical
- MeSH E04.100.814.790.830 – portasystemic shunt, transjugular intrahepatic
- MeSH E04.100.814.790.870 – splenorenal shunt, surgical
- MeSH E04.100.814.842 – thrombectomy
- MeSH E04.100.814.895 – venous cutdown

=== MeSH E04.157 – curettage ===
- MeSH E04.157.310 – dilatation and curettage
- MeSH E04.157.310.970 – vacuum curettage

=== MeSH E04.210 – digestive system surgical procedures ===
- MeSH E04.210.070 – anastomosis, roux-en-y
- MeSH E04.210.078 – appendectomy
- MeSH E04.210.120 – biliary tract surgical procedures
- MeSH E04.210.120.086 – biliopancreatic diversion
- MeSH E04.210.120.172 – cholecystectomy
- MeSH E04.210.120.172.140 – cholecystectomy, laparoscopic
- MeSH E04.210.120.195 – cholecystostomy
- MeSH E04.210.120.200 – choledochostomy
- MeSH E04.210.120.775 – portoenterostomy, hepatic
- MeSH E04.210.120.850 – sphincterotomy, endoscopic
- MeSH E04.210.120.860 – sphincterotomy, transhepatic
- MeSH E04.210.169 – biliopancreatic diversion
- MeSH E04.210.219 – colectomy
- MeSH E04.210.219.620 – proctocolectomy, restorative
- MeSH E04.210.240 – endoscopy, digestive system
- MeSH E04.210.240.160 – cholangiopancreatography, endoscopic retrograde
- MeSH E04.210.240.250 – endoscopy, gastrointestinal
- MeSH E04.210.240.250.160 – colonoscopy
- MeSH E04.210.240.250.160.800 – sigmoidoscopy
- MeSH E04.210.240.250.200 – duodenoscopy
- MeSH E04.210.240.250.320 – gastroscopy
- MeSH E04.210.240.250.680 – proctoscopy
- MeSH E04.210.240.250.840 – sphincterotomy, endoscopic
- MeSH E04.210.240.260 – esophagoscopy
- MeSH E04.210.338 – enterostomy
- MeSH E04.210.338.175 – cecostomy
- MeSH E04.210.338.225 – colostomy
- MeSH E04.210.338.303 – duodenostomy
- MeSH E04.210.338.508 – ileostomy
- MeSH E04.210.338.523 – jejunostomy
- MeSH E04.210.346 – esophagectomy
- MeSH E04.210.355 – esophagoplasty
- MeSH E04.210.358 – esophagostomy
- MeSH E04.210.390 – fundoplication
- MeSH E04.210.419 – gastrectomy
- MeSH E04.210.457 – gastroenterostomy
- MeSH E04.210.457.430 – gastric bypass
- MeSH E04.210.485 – gastroplasty
- MeSH E04.210.496 – gastrostomy
- MeSH E04.210.556 – hepatectomy
- MeSH E04.210.626 – jejunoileal bypass
- MeSH E04.210.650 – liver transplantation
- MeSH E04.210.725 – pancreas transplantation
- MeSH E04.210.752 – pancreatectomy
- MeSH E04.210.760 – pancreaticoduodenectomy
- MeSH E04.210.762 – pancreaticojejunostomy
- MeSH E04.210.790 – peritoneovenous shunt

=== MeSH E04.221 – dissection ===
- MeSH E04.221.580 – microdissection

=== MeSH E04.237 – drainage ===
- MeSH E04.237.890 – suction

=== MeSH E04.270 – endocrine surgical procedures ===
- MeSH E04.270.115 – adrenalectomy
- MeSH E04.270.282 – castration
- MeSH E04.270.282.679 – orchiectomy
- MeSH E04.270.282.685 – ovariectomy
- MeSH E04.270.532 – hypophysectomy
- MeSH E04.270.532.490 – hypophysectomy, chemical
- MeSH E04.270.550 – islets of langerhans transplantation
- MeSH E04.270.694 – parathyroidectomy
- MeSH E04.270.856 – thyroidectomy

=== MeSH E04.292 – extracorporeal circulation ===
- MeSH E04.292.413 – cardiopulmonary bypass
- MeSH E04.292.425 – chemotherapy, cancer, regional perfusion
- MeSH E04.292.451 – extracorporeal membrane oxygenation
- MeSH E04.292.465 – heart bypass, left
- MeSH E04.292.471 – hemofiltration
- MeSH E04.292.471.350 – hemodiafiltration
- MeSH E04.292.510 – hemoperfusion
- MeSH E04.292.762 – photopheresis
- MeSH E04.292.975 – ultrafiltration
- MeSH E04.292.975.300 – hemofiltration
- MeSH E04.292.975.300.300 – hemodiafiltration

=== MeSH E04.416 – laser surgery ===
- MeSH E04.416.075 – angioplasty, laser
- MeSH E04.416.075.080 – angioplasty, balloon, laser-assisted
- MeSH E04.416.237 – keratectomy, laser
- MeSH E04.416.237.500 – keratectomy, photorefractive, excimer laser
- MeSH E04.416.237.750 – keratomileusis, laser in situ
- MeSH E04.416.237.875 – keratectomy, subepithelial, laser-assisted
- MeSH E04.416.410 – laser coagulation

=== MeSH E04.446 – lymph node excision ===
- MeSH E04.446.318 – neck dissection
- MeSH E04.446.819 – sentinel lymph node biopsy

=== MeSH E04.466 – mastectomy ===
- MeSH E04.466.678 – mastectomy, radical
- MeSH E04.466.678.354 – mastectomy, extended radical
- MeSH E04.466.678.476 – mastectomy, modified radical
- MeSH E04.466.701 – mastectomy, segmental
- MeSH E04.466.754 – mastectomy, simple
- MeSH E04.466.823 – mastectomy, subcutaneous

=== MeSH E04.494 – microsurgery ===
- MeSH E04.494.150 – cerebral revascularization
- MeSH E04.494.575 – mohs surgery

=== MeSH E04.520 – obstetric surgical procedures ===
- MeSH E04.520.050 – abortion, induced
- MeSH E04.520.050.050 – abortion, eugenic
- MeSH E04.520.050.055 – abortion, legal
- MeSH E04.520.050.060 – abortion, therapeutic
- MeSH E04.520.050.060.600 – pregnancy reduction, multifetal
- MeSH E04.520.050.600 – pregnancy reduction, multifetal
- MeSH E04.520.100 – cerclage, cervical
- MeSH E04.520.150 – colposcopy
- MeSH E04.520.155 – colpotomy
- MeSH E04.520.160 – culdoscopy
- MeSH E04.520.252 – delivery, obstetric
- MeSH E04.520.252.500 – cesarean section
- MeSH E04.520.252.500.150 – cesarean section, repeat
- MeSH E04.520.252.750 – episiotomy
- MeSH E04.520.252.875 – extraction, obstetrical
- MeSH E04.520.252.875.970 – vacuum extraction, obstetrical
- MeSH E04.520.252.937 – home childbirth
- MeSH E04.520.252.968 – labor, induced
- MeSH E04.520.252.984 – natural childbirth
- MeSH E04.520.252.992 – vaginal birth after cesarean
- MeSH E04.520.252.996 – version, fetal
- MeSH E04.520.280 – fetoscopy
- MeSH E04.520.360 – hysteroscopy
- MeSH E04.520.365 – hysterotomy

=== MeSH E04.525 – neurosurgical procedures ===
- MeSH E04.525.044 – anterior temporal lobectomy
- MeSH E04.525.090 – brain tissue transplantation
- MeSH E04.525.160 – cerebral decortication
- MeSH E04.525.160.500 – hemispherectomy
- MeSH E04.525.170 – cerebrospinal fluid shunts
- MeSH E04.525.170.850 – ventriculoperitoneal shunt
- MeSH E04.525.170.860 – ventriculostomy
- MeSH E04.525.190 – craniotomy
- MeSH E04.525.210 – denervation
- MeSH E04.525.210.080 – autonomic denervation
- MeSH E04.525.210.080.600 – parasympathectomy
- MeSH E04.525.210.080.600.850 – vagotomy
- MeSH E04.525.210.080.600.850.850 – vagotomy, proximal gastric
- MeSH E04.525.210.080.600.850.860 – vagotomy, truncal
- MeSH E04.525.210.080.800 – sympathectomy
- MeSH E04.525.210.080.800.380 – ganglionectomy
- MeSH E04.525.210.080.800.800 – sympathectomy, chemical
- MeSH E04.525.210.145 – axotomy
- MeSH E04.525.210.210 – cordotomy
- MeSH E04.525.210.380 – ganglionectomy
- MeSH E04.525.210.500 – muscle denervation
- MeSH E04.525.210.550 – nerve block
- MeSH E04.525.210.560 – nerve crush
- MeSH E04.525.210.700 – rhizotomy
- MeSH E04.525.210.850 – vagotomy
- MeSH E04.525.210.850.850 – vagotomy, proximal gastric
- MeSH E04.525.210.850.860 – vagotomy, truncal
- MeSH E04.525.400 – hypophysectomy
- MeSH E04.525.450 – laminectomy
- MeSH E04.525.550 – nerve transfer
- MeSH E04.525.600 – psychosurgery
- MeSH E04.525.770 – split-brain procedure
- MeSH E04.525.800 – stereotaxic techniques
- MeSH E04.525.800.324 – neuronavigation
- MeSH E04.525.800.650 – radiosurgery
- MeSH E04.525.850 – trephining

=== MeSH E04.540 – ophthalmologic surgical procedures ===
- MeSH E04.540.104 – blepharoplasty
- MeSH E04.540.208 – cataract extraction
- MeSH E04.540.208.352 – capsulorhexis
- MeSH E04.540.208.704 – phacoemulsification
- MeSH E04.540.225 – corneal transplantation
- MeSH E04.540.225.225 – epikeratophakia
- MeSH E04.540.225.350 – keratoplasty, penetrating
- MeSH E04.540.255 – dacryocystorhinostomy
- MeSH E04.540.429 – eye enucleation
- MeSH E04.540.431 – eye evisceration
- MeSH E04.540.450 – filtering surgery
- MeSH E04.540.450.600 – sclerostomy
- MeSH E04.540.450.700 – trabeculectomy
- MeSH E04.540.480 – iridectomy
- MeSH E04.540.492 – keratectomy, photorefractive, excimer laser
- MeSH E04.540.535 – keratotomy, radial
- MeSH E04.540.590 – keratomileusis, laser in situ
- MeSH E04.540.600 – lens implantation, intraocular
- MeSH E04.540.630 – light coagulation
- MeSH E04.540.630.410 – laser coagulation
- MeSH E04.540.760 – orbit evisceration
- MeSH E04.540.890 – scleral buckling
- MeSH E04.540.892 – scleroplasty
- MeSH E04.540.960 – vitrectomy

=== MeSH E04.545 – oral surgical procedures ===
- MeSH E04.545.100 – apicoectomy
- MeSH E04.545.350 – gingivectomy
- MeSH E04.545.355 – gingivoplasty
- MeSH E04.545.380 – glossectomy
- MeSH E04.545.440 – jaw fixation techniques
- MeSH E04.545.500 – mandibular advancement
- MeSH E04.545.510 – maxillofacial prosthesis implantation
- MeSH E04.545.510.500 – mandibular prosthesis implantation
- MeSH E04.545.550 – oral surgical procedures, preprosthetic
- MeSH E04.545.550.100 – alveolar ridge augmentation
- MeSH E04.545.550.110 – alveolectomy
- MeSH E04.545.550.120 – alveoloplasty
- MeSH E04.545.550.280 – dental implantation
- MeSH E04.545.550.280.280 – dental implantation, endosseous
- MeSH E04.545.550.280.280.150 – blade implantation
- MeSH E04.545.550.280.280.280 – dental implantation, endosseous, endodontic
- MeSH E04.545.550.280.290 – dental implantation, subperiosteal
- MeSH E04.545.550.800 – vestibuloplasty
- MeSH E04.545.575 – osteotomy, le fort
- MeSH E04.545.700 – tooth extraction
- MeSH E04.545.700.680 – serial extraction
- MeSH E04.545.710 – tooth replantation

=== MeSH E04.555 – orthopedic procedures ===
- MeSH E04.555.080 – amputation
- MeSH E04.555.080.250 – disarticulation
- MeSH E04.555.080.380 – hemipelvectomy
- MeSH E04.555.100 – arthrodesis
- MeSH E04.555.100.700 – spinal fusion
- MeSH E04.555.110 – arthroplasty
- MeSH E04.555.110.110 – arthroplasty, replacement
- MeSH E04.555.110.110.054 – arthroplasty, replacement, finger
- MeSH E04.555.110.110.110 – arthroplasty, replacement, hip
- MeSH E04.555.110.110.115 – arthroplasty, replacement, knee
- MeSH E04.555.113 – arthroscopy
- MeSH E04.555.120 – bone lengthening
- MeSH E04.555.120.380 – ilizarov technique
- MeSH E04.555.120.690 – osteogenesis, distraction
- MeSH E04.555.130 – bone transplantation
- MeSH E04.555.130.100 – bone-patellar tendon-bone graft
- MeSH E04.555.200 – diskectomy
- MeSH E04.555.200.200 – diskectomy, percutaneous
- MeSH E04.555.300 – fracture fixation
- MeSH E04.555.300.300 – fracture fixation, internal
- MeSH E04.555.300.300.300 – fracture fixation, intramedullary
- MeSH E04.555.300.380 – ilizarov technique
- MeSH E04.555.400 – limb salvage
- MeSH E04.555.580 – osteotomy
- MeSH E04.555.580.580 – osteotomy, le fort
- MeSH E04.555.700 – tendon transfer
- MeSH E04.555.720 – traction

=== MeSH E04.579 – ostomy ===
- MeSH E04.579.240 – cystostomy
- MeSH E04.579.255 – dacryocystorhinostomy
- MeSH E04.579.338 – enterostomy
- MeSH E04.579.338.175 – cecostomy
- MeSH E04.579.338.225 – colostomy
- MeSH E04.579.338.303 – duodenostomy
- MeSH E04.579.338.508 – ileostomy
- MeSH E04.579.338.523 – jejunostomy
- MeSH E04.579.358 – esophagostomy
- MeSH E04.579.408 – gastrostomy
- MeSH E04.579.592 – middle ear ventilation
- MeSH E04.579.642 – nephrostomy, percutaneous
- MeSH E04.579.740 – pharyngostomy
- MeSH E04.579.895 – sclerostomy
- MeSH E04.579.918 – thoracostomy
- MeSH E04.579.935 – tracheostomy
- MeSH E04.579.947 – ureterostomy

=== MeSH E04.580 – otorhinolaryngologic surgical procedures ===
- MeSH E04.580.068 – adenoidectomy
- MeSH E04.580.369 – laryngectomy
- MeSH E04.580.373 – laryngoscopy
- MeSH E04.580.411 – neck dissection
- MeSH E04.580.450 – otologic surgical procedures
- MeSH E04.580.450.109 – auditory brain stem implantation
- MeSH E04.580.450.220 – cochlear implantation
- MeSH E04.580.450.230 – endolymphatic shunt
- MeSH E04.580.450.277 – fenestration, labyrinth
- MeSH E04.580.450.472 – middle ear ventilation
- MeSH E04.580.450.505 – myringoplasty
- MeSH E04.580.450.600 – ossicular replacement
- MeSH E04.580.450.731 – stapes surgery
- MeSH E04.580.450.731.681 – stapes mobilization
- MeSH E04.580.450.873 – tympanoplasty
- MeSH E04.580.515 – pharyngectomy
- MeSH E04.580.540 – pharyngostomy
- MeSH E04.580.677 – rhinoplasty
- MeSH E04.580.848 – tonsillectomy
- MeSH E04.580.900 – tracheostomy
- MeSH E04.580.907 – tracheotomy

=== MeSH E04.581 – paracentesis ===
- MeSH E04.581.100 – amniocentesis
- MeSH E04.581.620 – pericardiocentesis

=== MeSH E04.630 – postoperative period ===
- MeSH E04.630.055 – anesthesia recovery period

=== MeSH E04.641 – preoperative care ===
- MeSH E04.641.619 – preanesthetic medication

=== MeSH E04.650 – prosthesis implantation ===
- MeSH E04.650.110 – arthroplasty, replacement
- MeSH E04.650.110.054 – arthroplasty, replacement, finger
- MeSH E04.650.110.110 – arthroplasty, replacement, hip
- MeSH E04.650.110.115 – arthroplasty, replacement, knee
- MeSH E04.650.155 – auditory brain stem implantation
- MeSH E04.650.200 – blood vessel prosthesis implantation
- MeSH E04.650.210 – breast implantation
- MeSH E04.650.220 – cochlear implantation
- MeSH E04.650.230 – dental implantation
- MeSH E04.650.410 – heart valve prosthesis implantation
- MeSH E04.650.510 – maxillofacial prosthesis implantation
- MeSH E04.650.510.500 – mandibular prosthesis implantation
- MeSH E04.650.600 – ossicular replacement
- MeSH E04.650.620 – penile implantation

=== MeSH E04.680 – reconstructive surgical procedures ===
- MeSH E04.680.104 – blepharoplasty
- MeSH E04.680.152 – cervicoplasty
- MeSH E04.680.200 – chemexfoliation
- MeSH E04.680.250 – dermabrasion
- MeSH E04.680.300 – guided tissue regeneration
- MeSH E04.680.300.500 – guided tissue regeneration, periodontal
- MeSH E04.680.350 – limb salvage
- MeSH E04.680.450 – lipectomy
- MeSH E04.680.500 – mammaplasty
- MeSH E04.680.500.210 – breast implantation
- MeSH E04.680.650 – rhinoplasty
- MeSH E04.680.655 – rhytidoplasty
- MeSH E04.680.700 – scleroplasty
- MeSH E04.680.800 – tissue expansion

=== MeSH E04.800 – surgical procedures, minimally invasive ===
- MeSH E04.800.250 – endoscopy
- MeSH E04.800.250.035 – angioscopy
- MeSH E04.800.250.070 – arthroscopy
- MeSH E04.800.250.100 – bronchoscopy
- MeSH E04.800.250.150 – colposcopy
- MeSH E04.800.250.160 – culdoscopy
- MeSH E04.800.250.180 – cystoscopy
- MeSH E04.800.250.250 – endoscopy, digestive system
- MeSH E04.800.250.250.160 – cholangiopancreatography, endoscopic retrograde
- MeSH E04.800.250.250.250 – endoscopy, gastrointestinal
- MeSH E04.800.250.250.250.160 – colonoscopy
- MeSH E04.800.250.250.250.160.800 – sigmoidoscopy
- MeSH E04.800.250.250.250.200 – duodenoscopy
- MeSH E04.800.250.250.250.320 – gastroscopy
- MeSH E04.800.250.250.250.680 – proctoscopy
- MeSH E04.800.250.250.250.840 – sphincterotomy, endoscopic
- MeSH E04.800.250.250.260 – esophagoscopy
- MeSH E04.800.250.280 – fetoscopy
- MeSH E04.800.250.360 – hysteroscopy
- MeSH E04.800.250.520 – laparoscopy
- MeSH E04.800.250.520.160 – cholecystectomy, laparoscopic
- MeSH E04.800.250.525 – laryngoscopy
- MeSH E04.800.250.560 – mediastinoscopy
- MeSH E04.800.250.700 – neuroendoscopy
- MeSH E04.800.250.840 – thoracoscopy
- MeSH E04.800.250.840.830 – thoracic surgery, video-assisted
- MeSH E04.800.250.920 – ureteroscopy
- MeSH E04.800.250.950 – video-assisted surgery
- MeSH E04.800.250.950.830 – thoracic surgery, video-assisted

=== MeSH E04.901 – suture techniques ===
- MeSH E04.901.800 – surgical stapling

=== MeSH E04.928 – thoracic surgical procedures ===
- MeSH E04.928.220 – cardiac surgical procedures
- MeSH E04.928.220.220 – cardiomyoplasty
- MeSH E04.928.220.360 – heart arrest, induced
- MeSH E04.928.220.360.500 – circulatory arrest, deep hypothermia induced
- MeSH E04.928.220.370 – heart bypass, right
- MeSH E04.928.220.370.295 – fontan procedure
- MeSH E04.928.220.380 – heart massage
- MeSH E04.928.220.390 – heart transplantation
- MeSH E04.928.220.390.450 – heart-lung transplantation
- MeSH E04.928.220.410 – heart valve prosthesis implantation
- MeSH E04.928.220.520 – myocardial revascularization
- MeSH E04.928.220.520.100 – angioplasty, transluminal, percutaneous coronary
- MeSH E04.928.220.520.110 – atherectomy, coronary
- MeSH E04.928.220.520.220 – coronary artery bypass
- MeSH E04.928.220.520.220.189 – coronary artery bypass, off-pump
- MeSH E04.928.220.520.220.380 – internal mammary-coronary artery anastomosis
- MeSH E04.928.220.600 – pericardial window techniques
- MeSH E04.928.220.605 – pericardiectomy
- MeSH E04.928.220.620 – pericardiocentesis
- MeSH E04.928.490 – mediastinoscopy
- MeSH E04.928.600 – pulmonary surgical procedures
- MeSH E04.928.600.080 – bronchoscopy
- MeSH E04.928.600.220 – collapse therapy
- MeSH E04.928.600.220.610 – pneumonolysis
- MeSH E04.928.600.220.620 – pneumothorax, artificial
- MeSH E04.928.600.495 – lung transplantation
- MeSH E04.928.600.495.450 – heart-lung transplantation
- MeSH E04.928.600.600 – pneumonectomy
- MeSH E04.928.600.610 – pneumonolysis
- MeSH E04.928.750 – thoracoplasty
- MeSH E04.928.752 – thoracoscopy
- MeSH E04.928.752.830 – thoracic surgery, video-assisted
- MeSH E04.928.755 – thoracostomy
- MeSH E04.928.760 – thoracotomy
- MeSH E04.928.770 – thymectomy
- MeSH E04.928.780 – tracheostomy
- MeSH E04.928.790 – tracheotomy

=== MeSH E04.932 – tissue and organ harvesting ===
- MeSH E04.932.500 – donor selection

=== MeSH E04.936 – transplantation ===
- MeSH E04.936.225 – cell transplantation
- MeSH E04.936.225.375 – islets of langerhans transplantation
- MeSH E04.936.225.687 – stem cell transplantation
- MeSH E04.936.225.687.155 – bone marrow transplantation
- MeSH E04.936.225.687.312 – cord blood stem cell transplantation
- MeSH E04.936.225.687.500 – hematopoietic stem cell transplantation
- MeSH E04.936.225.687.625 – mesenchymal stem cell transplantation
- MeSH E04.936.225.687.750 – peripheral blood stem cell transplantation
- MeSH E04.936.337 – cold ischemia
- MeSH E04.936.450 – organ transplantation
- MeSH E04.936.450.050 – bone transplantation
- MeSH E04.936.450.050.100 – bone-patellar tendon-bone graft
- MeSH E04.936.450.475 – heart transplantation
- MeSH E04.936.450.475.450 – heart-lung transplantation
- MeSH E04.936.450.485 – kidney transplantation
- MeSH E04.936.450.490 – liver transplantation
- MeSH E04.936.450.495 – lung transplantation
- MeSH E04.936.450.495.450 – heart-lung transplantation
- MeSH E04.936.450.650 – pancreas transplantation
- MeSH E04.936.494 – replantation
- MeSH E04.936.494.711 – tooth replantation
- MeSH E04.936.580 – tissue transplantation
- MeSH E04.936.580.040 – bone marrow transplantation
- MeSH E04.936.580.090 – brain tissue transplantation
- MeSH E04.936.580.225 – corneal transplantation
- MeSH E04.936.580.225.225 – epikeratophakia
- MeSH E04.936.580.225.350 – keratoplasty, penetrating
- MeSH E04.936.580.300 – fetal tissue transplantation
- MeSH E04.936.580.490 – liver transplantation
- MeSH E04.936.580.700 – skin transplantation
- MeSH E04.936.664 – transplantation, autologous
- MeSH E04.936.764 – transplantation, heterologous
- MeSH E04.936.800 – transplantation, heterotopic
- MeSH E04.936.864 – transplantation, homologous
- MeSH E04.936.864.700 – transplantation, isogeneic
- MeSH E04.936.932 – warm ischemia

=== MeSH E04.950 – urogenital surgical procedures ===
- MeSH E04.950.165 – castration
- MeSH E04.950.165.679 – orchiectomy
- MeSH E04.950.165.685 – ovariectomy
- MeSH E04.950.300 – gynecologic surgical procedures
- MeSH E04.950.300.200 – circumcision, female
- MeSH E04.950.300.210 – colposcopy
- MeSH E04.950.300.220 – colpotomy
- MeSH E04.950.300.259 – culdoscopy
- MeSH E04.950.300.299 – dilatation and curettage
- MeSH E04.950.300.299.970 – vacuum curettage
- MeSH E04.950.300.399 – hysterectomy
- MeSH E04.950.300.399.380 – hysterectomy, vaginal
- MeSH E04.950.300.539 – hysteroscopy
- MeSH E04.950.300.680 – ovariectomy
- MeSH E04.950.300.750 – salpingostomy
- MeSH E04.950.300.766 – sterilization, tubal
- MeSH E04.950.599 – sterilization, reproductive
- MeSH E04.950.599.450 – sterilization, involuntary
- MeSH E04.950.599.500 – sterilization reversal
- MeSH E04.950.599.500.800 – vasovasostomy
- MeSH E04.950.599.683 – sterilization, tubal
- MeSH E04.950.599.900 – vasectomy
- MeSH E04.950.774 – urologic surgical procedures
- MeSH E04.950.774.150 – cystectomy
- MeSH E04.950.774.175 – kidney transplantation
- MeSH E04.950.774.180 – cystoscopy
- MeSH E04.950.774.435 – nephrectomy
- MeSH E04.950.774.840 – ureteroscopy
- MeSH E04.950.774.852 – urinary diversion
- MeSH E04.950.774.852.240 – cystostomy
- MeSH E04.950.774.852.642 – nephrostomy, percutaneous
- MeSH E04.950.774.852.947 – ureterostomy
- MeSH E04.950.774.860 – urologic surgical procedures, male
- MeSH E04.950.774.860.226 – circumcision
- MeSH E04.950.774.860.618 – orchiectomy
- MeSH E04.950.774.860.620 – penile implantation
- MeSH E04.950.774.860.625 – prostatectomy
- MeSH E04.950.774.860.625.750 – transurethral resection of prostate
- MeSH E04.950.774.860.800 – ultrasound, high-intensity focused, transrectal
- MeSH E04.950.774.860.856 – vasectomy
- MeSH E04.950.774.860.956 – vasovasostomy

The list continues at List of MeSH codes (E05).
