= List of MeSH codes (E07) =

The following is a partial list of the "E" codes for Medical Subject Headings (MeSH), as defined by the United States National Library of Medicine (NLM).

This list continues the information at List of MeSH codes (E06). Codes following these are found at List of MeSH codes (F01). For other MeSH codes, see List of MeSH codes.

The source for this content is the set of 2006 MeSH Trees from the NLM.

== MeSH E07 – equipment and supplies ==
=== MeSH E07.101 – bandages ===
- MeSH E07.101.074 – bandages, hydrocolloid
- MeSH E07.101.150 – biological dressings
- MeSH E07.101.650 – occlusive dressings

=== MeSH E07.190 – contraceptive devices ===
- MeSH E07.190.250 – contraceptive devices, female
- MeSH E07.190.250.260 – condoms, female
- MeSH E07.190.250.520 – intrauterine devices
- MeSH E07.190.250.520.259 – intrauterine device expulsion
- MeSH E07.190.250.520.520 – intrauterine devices, medicated
- MeSH E07.190.250.520.520.300 – intrauterine devices, copper
- MeSH E07.190.270 – contraceptive devices, male
- MeSH E07.190.270.150 – condoms

=== MeSH E07.206 – culture media ===
- MeSH E07.206.250 – culture media, conditioned
- MeSH E07.206.255 – culture media, serum-free

=== MeSH E07.222 – dental equipment ===
- MeSH E07.222.210 – dental articulators
- MeSH E07.222.250 – dental devices, home care
- MeSH E07.222.376 – dental high-speed equipment
- MeSH E07.222.501 – dental instruments
- MeSH E07.222.501.630 – matrix bands
- MeSH E07.222.670 – rubber dams

=== MeSH E07.230 – diagnostic equipment ===
- MeSH E07.230.220 – endoscopes
- MeSH E07.230.220.040 – angioscopes
- MeSH E07.230.220.060 – arthroscopes
- MeSH E07.230.220.090 – bronchoscopes
- MeSH E07.230.220.170 – colposcopes
- MeSH E07.230.220.180 – culdoscopes
- MeSH E07.230.220.190 – cystoscopes
- MeSH E07.230.220.260 – endoscopes, gastrointestinal
- MeSH E07.230.220.260.160 – colonoscopes
- MeSH E07.230.220.260.160.800 – sigmoidoscopes
- MeSH E07.230.220.260.200 – duodenoscopes
- MeSH E07.230.220.260.260 – esophagoscopes
- MeSH E07.230.220.260.320 – gastroscopes
- MeSH E07.230.220.260.680 – proctoscopes
- MeSH E07.230.220.280 – fetoscopes
- MeSH E07.230.220.390 – hysteroscopes
- MeSH E07.230.220.520 – laparoscopes
- MeSH E07.230.220.525 – laryngoscopes
- MeSH E07.230.220.565 – mediastinoscopes
- MeSH E07.230.220.707 – neuroendoscopes
- MeSH E07.230.220.850 – thoracoscopes
- MeSH E07.230.220.895 – ureteroscopes
- MeSH E07.230.380 – flowmeters
- MeSH E07.230.540 – ophthalmoscopes
- MeSH E07.230.540.500 – retinoscopes
- MeSH E07.230.550 – otoscopes
- MeSH E07.230.740 – sphygmomanometers
- MeSH E07.230.740.100 – blood pressure monitors
- MeSH E07.230.750 – stethoscopes

=== MeSH E07.292 – electric power supplies ===
- MeSH E07.292.150 – bioelectric energy sources

=== MeSH E07.296 – electrodes ===
- MeSH E07.296.159 – defibrillators
- MeSH E07.296.159.175 – defibrillators, implantable
- MeSH E07.296.319 – electrodes, implanted
- MeSH E07.296.319.074 – auditory brain stem implants
- MeSH E07.296.319.150 – cochlear implants
- MeSH E07.296.319.175 – defibrillators, implantable
- MeSH E07.296.471 – ion-selective electrodes
- MeSH E07.296.500 – microelectrodes

=== MeSH E07.325 – equipment and supplies, hospital ===
- MeSH E07.325.068 – absorbent pads
- MeSH E07.325.068.124 – diapers, adult
- MeSH E07.325.068.249 – diapers, infant
- MeSH E07.325.068.500 – incontinence pads
- MeSH E07.325.137 – bedding and linen
- MeSH E07.325.220 – beds
- MeSH E07.325.473 – hospitals, packaged
- MeSH E07.325.569 – incubators, infant
- MeSH E07.325.755 – patient isolators

=== MeSH E07.461 – incubators ===
- MeSH E07.461.487 – incubators, infant

=== MeSH E07.490 – infant equipment ===
- MeSH E07.490.500 – pacifiers

=== MeSH E07.505 – infusion pumps ===
- MeSH E07.505.254 – infusion pumps, implantable
- MeSH E07.505.508 – insulin infusion systems

=== MeSH E07.532 – lenses ===
- MeSH E07.532.276 – contact lenses
- MeSH E07.532.276.360 – contact lenses, hydrophilic
- MeSH E07.532.276.360.220 – contact lenses, extended-wear
- MeSH E07.532.300 – eyeglasses
- MeSH E07.532.460 – lenses, intraocular

=== MeSH E07.565 – microspheres ===
- MeSH E07.565.500 – quantum dots

=== MeSH E07.605 – nebulizers and vaporizers ===
- MeSH E07.605.500 – metered dose inhalers
- MeSH E07.605.500.500 – inhalation spacers

=== MeSH E07.652 – oxygenators ===
- MeSH E07.652.582 – oxygenators, membrane

=== MeSH E07.695 – prostheses and implants ===
- MeSH E07.695.025 – absorbable implants
- MeSH E07.695.050 – artificial limbs
- MeSH E07.695.075 – auditory brain stem implant
- MeSH E07.695.100 – bioprosthesis
- MeSH E07.695.110 – blood vessel prosthesis
- MeSH E07.695.120 – bone nails
- MeSH E07.695.125 – bone plates
- MeSH E07.695.130 – bone screws
- MeSH E07.695.140 – breast implants
- MeSH E07.695.150 – cochlear implants
- MeSH E07.695.175 – defibrillators, implantable
- MeSH E07.695.185 – dental implants
- MeSH E07.695.185.185 – dental implants, single-tooth
- MeSH E07.695.190 – dental prosthesis
- MeSH E07.695.190.175 – dental abutments
- MeSH E07.695.190.180 – dental clasps
- MeSH E07.695.190.185 – dental prosthesis, implant-supported
- MeSH E07.695.190.190 – dental restoration, permanent
- MeSH E07.695.190.190.150 – crowns
- MeSH E07.695.190.190.350 – inlays
- MeSH E07.695.190.192 – dental restoration, temporary
- MeSH E07.695.190.200 – dentures
- MeSH E07.695.190.200.200 – denture bases
- MeSH E07.695.190.200.205 – denture, complete
- MeSH E07.695.190.200.205.205 – denture, complete, immediate
- MeSH E07.695.190.200.205.210 – denture, complete, lower
- MeSH E07.695.190.200.205.215 – denture, complete, upper
- MeSH E07.695.190.200.210 – denture liners
- MeSH E07.695.190.200.215 – denture, overlay
- MeSH E07.695.190.200.220 – denture, partial
- MeSH E07.695.190.200.220.220 – denture, partial, fixed
- MeSH E07.695.190.200.220.220.220 – denture, partial, fixed, resin-bonded
- MeSH E07.695.190.200.220.225 – denture, partial, immediate
- MeSH E07.695.190.200.220.230 – denture, partial, removable
- MeSH E07.695.190.200.220.235 – denture, partial, temporary
- MeSH E07.695.190.200.220.245 – denture precision attachment
- MeSH E07.695.190.600 – palatal obturators
- MeSH E07.695.190.610 – periodontal prosthesis
- MeSH E07.695.190.800 – tooth, artificial
- MeSH E07.695.225 – eye, artificial
- MeSH E07.695.250 – glaucoma drainage implants
- MeSH E07.695.250.500 – molteno implants
- MeSH E07.695.300 – heart, artificial
- MeSH E07.695.300.300 – heart-assist devices
- MeSH E07.695.310 – heart valve prosthesis
- MeSH E07.695.340 – implants, experimental
- MeSH E07.695.350 – internal fixators
- MeSH E07.695.400 – joint prosthesis
- MeSH E07.695.400.400 – hip prosthesis
- MeSH E07.695.400.410 – knee prosthesis
- MeSH E07.695.450 – larynx, artificial
- MeSH E07.695.460 – lenses, intraocular
- MeSH E07.695.510 – maxillofacial prosthesis
- MeSH E07.695.510.500 – mandibular prosthesis
- MeSH E07.695.540 – orbital implants
- MeSH E07.695.550 – ossicular prosthesis
- MeSH E07.695.610 – penile prosthesis
- MeSH E07.695.750 – stents
- MeSH E07.695.800 – tissue expanders
- MeSH E07.695.850 – urinary sphincter, artificial
- MeSH E07.695.900 – vena cava filters

=== MeSH E07.700 – protective devices ===
- MeSH E07.700.100 – air bags
- MeSH E07.700.250 – ear protective devices
- MeSH E07.700.260 – eye protective devices
- MeSH E07.700.380 – head protective devices
- MeSH E07.700.500 – masks
- MeSH E07.700.500.450 – laryngeal masks
- MeSH E07.700.520 – mouth protectors
- MeSH E07.700.600 – protective clothing
- MeSH E07.700.600.400 – gloves, protective
- MeSH E07.700.600.400.400 – gloves, surgical
- MeSH E07.700.600.700 – space suits
- MeSH E07.700.700 – respiratory protective devices
- MeSH E07.700.800 – seat belts

=== MeSH E07.720 – reagent kits, diagnostic ===
- MeSH E07.720.720 – reagent strips

=== MeSH E07.796 – self-help devices ===
- MeSH E07.796.250 – communication aids for disabled
- MeSH E07.796.980 – wheelchairs

=== MeSH E07.814 – sensory aids ===
- MeSH E07.814.458 – hearing aids
- MeSH E07.814.458.074 – auditory brain stem implant
- MeSH E07.814.458.150 – cochlear implants

=== MeSH E07.858 – surgical equipment ===
- MeSH E07.858.082 – artificial organs
- MeSH E07.858.082.050 – artificial limbs
- MeSH E07.858.082.212 – bioartificial organs
- MeSH E07.858.082.374 – heart, artificial
- MeSH E07.858.082.374.300 – heart-assist devices
- MeSH E07.858.082.458 – heart-lung machine
- MeSH E07.858.082.505 – infusion pumps
- MeSH E07.858.082.505.254 – infusion pumps, implantable
- MeSH E07.858.082.505.508 – insulin infusion systems
- MeSH E07.858.082.585 – kidney, artificial
- MeSH E07.858.082.595 – larynx, artificial
- MeSH E07.858.082.620 – liver, artificial
- MeSH E07.858.082.748 – pacemaker, artificial
- MeSH E07.858.082.760 – pancreas, artificial
- MeSH E07.858.082.800 – skin, artificial
- MeSH E07.858.082.900 – urinary sphincter, artificial
- MeSH E07.858.150 – chest tubes
- MeSH E07.858.240 – endoscopes
- MeSH E07.858.240.040 – angioscopes
- MeSH E07.858.240.060 – arthroscopes
- MeSH E07.858.240.090 – bronchoscopes
- MeSH E07.858.240.170 – colposcopes
- MeSH E07.858.240.180 – culdoscopes
- MeSH E07.858.240.190 – cystoscopes
- MeSH E07.858.240.260 – endoscopes, gastrointestinal
- MeSH E07.858.240.260.160 – colonoscopes
- MeSH E07.858.240.260.160.800 – sigmoidoscopes
- MeSH E07.858.240.260.200 – duodenoscopes
- MeSH E07.858.240.260.260 – esophagoscopes
- MeSH E07.858.240.260.320 – gastroscopes
- MeSH E07.858.240.260.680 – proctoscopes
- MeSH E07.858.240.280 – fetoscopes
- MeSH E07.858.240.390 – hysteroscopes
- MeSH E07.858.240.520 – laparoscopes
- MeSH E07.858.240.525 – laryngoscopes
- MeSH E07.858.240.565 – mediastinoscopes
- MeSH E07.858.240.707 – neuroendoscopes
- MeSH E07.858.240.850 – thoracoscopes
- MeSH E07.858.240.895 – ureteroscopes
- MeSH E07.858.400 – nebulizers and vaporizers
- MeSH E07.858.442 – orthopedic equipment
- MeSH E07.858.442.050 – artificial limbs
- MeSH E07.858.442.250 – canes
- MeSH E07.858.442.281 – crutches
- MeSH E07.858.442.660 – orthopedic fixation devices
- MeSH E07.858.442.660.100 – bone nails
- MeSH E07.858.442.660.110 – bone plates
- MeSH E07.858.442.660.115 – bone screws
- MeSH E07.858.442.660.120 – bone wires
- MeSH E07.858.442.660.414 – casts, surgical
- MeSH E07.858.442.660.430 – external fixators
- MeSH E07.858.442.660.460 – internal fixators
- MeSH E07.858.442.660.845 – splints
- MeSH E07.858.442.743 – orthotic devices
- MeSH E07.858.442.743.319 – braces
- MeSH E07.858.442.980 – walkers
- MeSH E07.858.499 – pessaries
- MeSH E07.858.700 – surgical instruments
- MeSH E07.858.700.650 – obstetrical forceps
- MeSH E07.858.700.750 – surgical staplers
- MeSH E07.858.708 – surgical mesh
- MeSH E07.858.740 – surgical sponges
- MeSH E07.858.740.300 – gelatin sponge, absorbable
- MeSH E07.858.784 – sutures
- MeSH E07.858.784.250 – catgut
- MeSH E07.858.826 – tampons
- MeSH E07.858.876 – tissue adhesives
- MeSH E07.858.886 – tissue expanders
- MeSH E07.858.925 – trusses

=== MeSH E07.862 – surgically created structures ===
- MeSH E07.862.200 – colonic pouches
- MeSH E07.862.700 – skeletal muscle ventricle
- MeSH E07.862.705 – stomas
- MeSH E07.862.710 – surgical flaps
- MeSH E07.862.750 – urinary reservoirs, continent

=== MeSH E07.943 – transducers ===
- MeSH E07.943.901 – transducers, pressure

=== MeSH E07.950 – ventilators, mechanical ===
- MeSH E07.950.500 – ventilators, negative-pressure

=== MeSH E07.970 – x-ray intensifying screens ===
The list continues at List of MeSH codes (F01).
