= Extraperitoneal space =

Details

Identifiers
- Latin: spatium extraperitoneale
- TA98: A10.1.01.001
- TA2: 3813
- FMA: 14730

The extraperitoneal space is the portion of the abdomen and pelvis which does not lie within the peritoneum.

It includes:

- Retroperitoneal space, situated posteriorly to the peritoneum
- Preperitoneal space, situated anteriorly to the peritoneum
  - Retropubic space, deep to the pubic bone
  - Retro-inguinal space, deep to the inguinal ligament

The space in the pelvis is divided into the following components:

- prevesical space
- perivesical space
- perirectal space

== See also ==
- Retropubic space
- Rectovesical pouch
- Vesicouterine pouch
- Rectouterine pouch (Pouch of Douglas)
