= Retroperitoneal space =

Anatomical space in the abdominal cavity behind the peritoneum

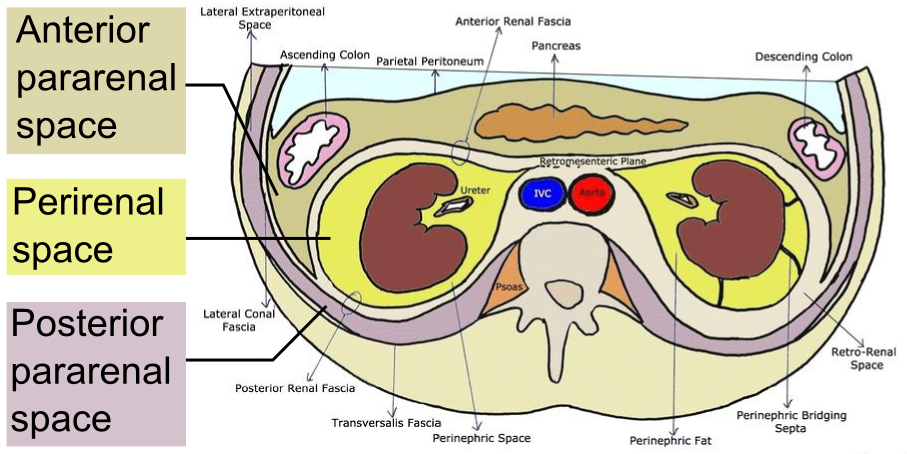
- Horizontal plane through the kidneys, showing subdivisions of the retroperitoneal space. The anterior and posterior pararenal spaces have been exaggerated to provide representation of their relation to other retroperitoneal structures.

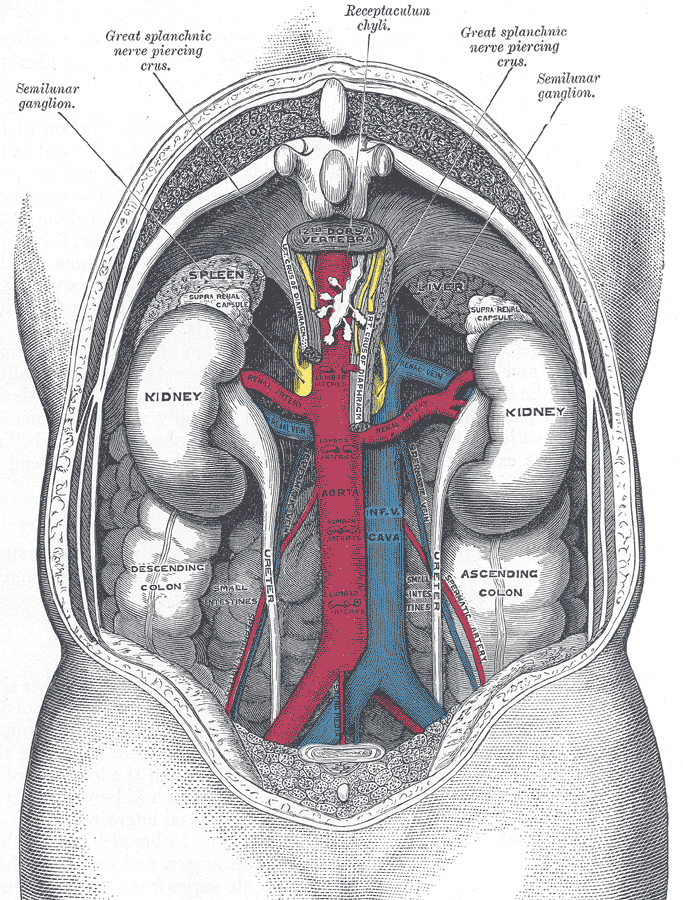
- Human kidneys viewed from behind with spine removed

Details

Identifiers
- Latin: spatium retroperitoneale
- MeSH: D012187
- TA98: A10.1.01.002
- TA2: 3814
- FMA: 15080

The retroperitoneal space (retroperitoneum) is the anatomical space (sometimes a potential space) behind (retro) the peritoneum. It has no specific delineating anatomical structures. Organs are retroperitoneal if they have peritoneum on their anterior side only. Structures that are not suspended by mesentery in the abdominal cavity and that lie between the parietal peritoneum and abdominal wall are classified as retroperitoneal.

This is different from organs that are not retroperitoneal, which have peritoneum on their posterior side and are suspended by mesentery in the abdominal cavity.

The retroperitoneum can be further subdivided into the following:

- Perirenal (or perinephric) space
- Anterior pararenal (or paranephric) space
- Posterior pararenal (or paranephric) space

== Retroperitoneal structures ==
Structures that lie behind the peritoneum are termed "retroperitoneal". Organs that were once suspended within the abdominal cavity by mesentery but migrated posterior to the peritoneum during the course of embryogenesis to become retroperitoneal are considered to be secondarily retroperitoneal organs.

- Primarily retroperitoneal, meaning the structures were retroperitoneal during the entirety of development:
  - urinary
    - adrenal glands
    - kidneys
    - ureter
  - circulatory
    - aorta
    - inferior vena cava
  - digestive
    - anal canal
- Secondarily retroperitoneal, meaning the structures initially were suspended in mesentery and later migrated behind the peritoneum during development
  - the duodenum, except for the proximal first segment, which is intraperitoneal
  - ascending and descending portions of the colon (but not the transverse colon, sigmoid and the cecum)
  - pancreas, except for the tail, which is intraperitoneal

=== Subdivisions ===
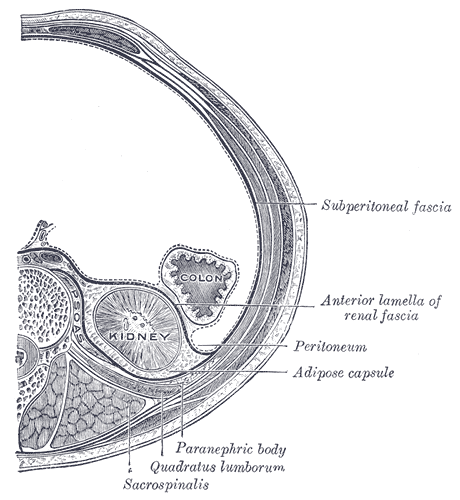
Transverse section, showing the relations of the capsule of the kidney. (Peritoneum is labeled at center right.)

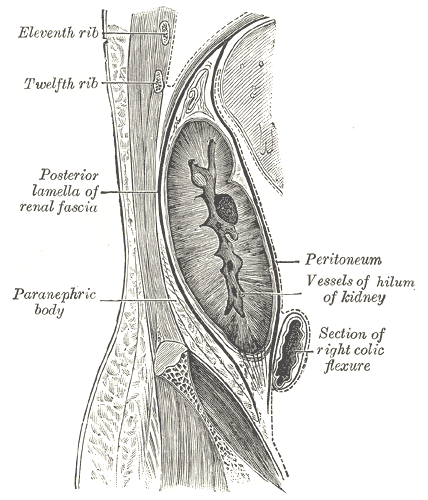
Sagittal section through posterior abdominal wall, showing the relations of the capsule of the kidney (pararenal fat labeled as paranephric body center left)

Perirenal space

It is also called the perinephric space. Bounded by the anterior and posterior leaves of the renal fascia. It contains the following structures:

- Adrenal gland
- Kidney
- Renal vessels
- Perirenal fat (also "perirenal fat capsule", "perinephric fat, or "adipose capsule of the kidney") is external to the fibrous capsule of the kidney, and internal to the renal fascia (which separates it from the pararenal fat); connective tissue trabeculae extend through it to unite the fibrous capsule of the kidney, and the renal fascia. Perirenal fat is most abundant upon the posterior aspect, inferior pole and along the lateral margins of the kidney.

Anterior pararenal space

Bounded by the posterior layer of peritoneum and the anterior leaf of the renal fascia. It contains the following structures:

- Pancreas
- Ascending and descending colon
- Duodenum

Posterior pararenal space

Bounded by the posterior leaf of the renal fascia and the muscles of the posterior abdominal wall. It contains only fat ("pararenal fat" also known as "pararenal fat body", "paranephric body", or "paranephric fat").

Pararenal fat is a fatty layer situated posterior to the renal compartment, and extending inferiorly into the iliac fossa. It is situated posterior to the posterior aspect of renal fascia, and anterior to the aponeuroses of the retrorenal muscles. It is plentiful in the dihedral angle of the iliopsoas muscle and the quadratus lumborum muscle, filling the lumbar fossa posterior and inferior to the kidney.

== Clinical significance ==
Bleeding from a blood vessel or structure in the retroperitoneal area such as the aorta or inferior vena cava into the retroperitoneal space can lead to a retroperitoneal hemorrhage.

- Retroperitoneal fibrosis
- Retroperitoneal lymph node dissection

The portion of the retroperitoneum that is posterior to the wall of the abdomen and superior to the iliac vessels is of importance in gynecologic oncology. This is the region where para-aortic and paracaval lymphadenectomies take place. The lateral boundary of the retroperitoneum is defined by the ascending and descending colon.

It is also possible to have a neoplasm in this area, more commonly a metastasis; or very rarely a primary neoplasm. The most common type is a sarcoma followed by lymphoma, extragonadal germ cell tumor, and gastrointestinal stromal tumor/GIST. Examples of tumors include:

- Primary peritoneal carcinoma
- Pseudomyxoma peritonei

Examples of sarcomas include:

- Soft-tissue sarcoma
  - liposarcoma
  - leiomyosarcoma
  - Undifferentiated pleomorphic sarcoma, a clinically distinct sarcoma of the area

== See also ==
- Intraperitoneal
- Retropubic space
- Rectovesical pouch
- Vesicouterine pouch
- Rectouterine pouch (Pouch of Douglas)
