= Blumer's shelf =

Medical sign

Blumer's shelf, or the rectal shelf, is a finding palpable (felt) in rectal or vaginal examination that indicates that a tumor has metastasized to the pouch of Douglas.

It is usually a site of metastasis of cancers of the lung, pancreas and stomach, due to metastatic tumor cells gravitating from an abdominal cancer and growing in the rectovesical or rectouterine pouch.

== Bibliography ==
- Blumer, G. (1909). "Rectal shelf: neglected rectal sign of value in diagnosis of obscure malignant and inflammatory disease within the abdomen." Albany Medical Annals. 30:361.
