= Excavation (medicine) =

In medicine, excavation has two meanings:

- the act of hollowing out (e.g., to remove damaged or infected tissue)
- the space hollowed out, or a natural cavity or pouch

== In anatomy ==
Examples of naturally hollow spaces that are considered excavations include:

- Rectouterine pouch or excavation, between the uterus and the rectum
- Rectovesical excavation, between the rectum and the male bladder
- Vesicouterine excavation, between the bladder and the uterus in a female

== In medical and dental procedures ==
The tool used to create an excavation (e.g., to remove damaged areas before filling dental caries) is an excavator. Excavation is also the technique used to remove granulation tissue when necessary.
