= Retroinguinal space =

Region in the human hip

Details

Identifiers
- Latin: spatium retroinguinale
- TA98: A10.1.01.004
- TA2: 3823
- FMA: 74031

The retroinguinal space (or Bogros' space) is the extraperitoneal space situated deep to the inguinal ligament. It's limited by the fascia transversalis anteriorly, the peritoneum posteriorly and the iliac fascia laterally. This preperitoneal space communicates with prevesical space of Retzius. It is divided into two compartments. The medial compartment contains vasculature including the femoral artery and vein. The lateral compartment allows for passage of the iliopsoas (primary hip flexor), allowing attachment to the femur, along with the femoral nerve.
