= Transvaginal =

Transvaginal refers to a transluminal procedure through the reproductive tract of the vagina, including:

- Transvaginal oocyte retrieval
- Transvaginal ultrasonography
- Transvaginal mesh
