= Transvaginal mesh =

Gynecological surgical implant

Transvaginal mesh, also known as vaginal mesh implant, is a net-like surgical tool that is used to treat pelvic organ prolapse (POP) and stress urinary incontinence (SUI) among female patients. The surgical mesh is placed transvaginally to reconstruct weakened pelvic muscle walls and to support the urethra or bladder.

A number of mesh materials with varying absorbability has been explored to maximise the biocompatibility as well as the repair efficacy of mesh. Depending on the target vaginal space, the application of transvaginal mesh differs in terms of mesh shape, surgical incision and the position of mesh.

Since 2019, transvaginal mesh has been banned by the US Food and Drug Administration (FDA) due to the high prevalence of complications, including mesh erosion, pain and pelvic infection. Complications may arise from concomitant surgery and inappropriate surgical techniques, while they can also be prevented with uterus preservation. Transvaginal mesh was once used widely for nearly 25% of prolapse interventions until the FDA ban, yet approximately 1 out of 15 patients required a mesh removal in the past decade.

== Classification ==
Based on how transvaginal mesh reacts inside the patient’s body, the implant is classified into 4 subtypes:

- “Non-absorbable synthetic mesh” is made from synthetic materials, for example, plastic, polyester or polypropylene. It is most preferred by surgeons because of its compatibility with connective tissues, which increases repair efficacy and reduces the rate of infection. It can be further classified based on pore size to determine risk of infection and mesh exposure. Meshes with pore sizes larger than 75μm are most commonly used for repair as they aid tissue incorporation and lower infection risk.
- “Absorbable synthetic mesh” is made from synthetic materials, such as polyglactin and polyglycolic, and can be absorbed by the body. Tissues nearby will then grow at the implantation site, strengthening the ligaments in the pelvis region.
- “Biologic mesh”, also known as graft, is made from natural products derived from disinfected animal tissues, such as tissues from cows and pigs. This mesh subtype only works temporarily as it degrades over time, leading to inconsistent tissue strength and a higher failure rate. It also carries a theoretical transmission risk of infectious disease.
- “Composite mesh” is made from a combination of the above subtypes.

The selection of mesh subtype to be placed in patients requires consideration of patients' preference and risk analysis, including evaluation of recurrence risk and complication risk by surgical personnel.

== Medical uses ==
Transvaginal mesh is used to repair symptomatic pelvic organ prolapse that causes pain and discomfort among patients and to treat stress urinary incontinence.

=== Pelvic organ prolapse (POP) Repair ===
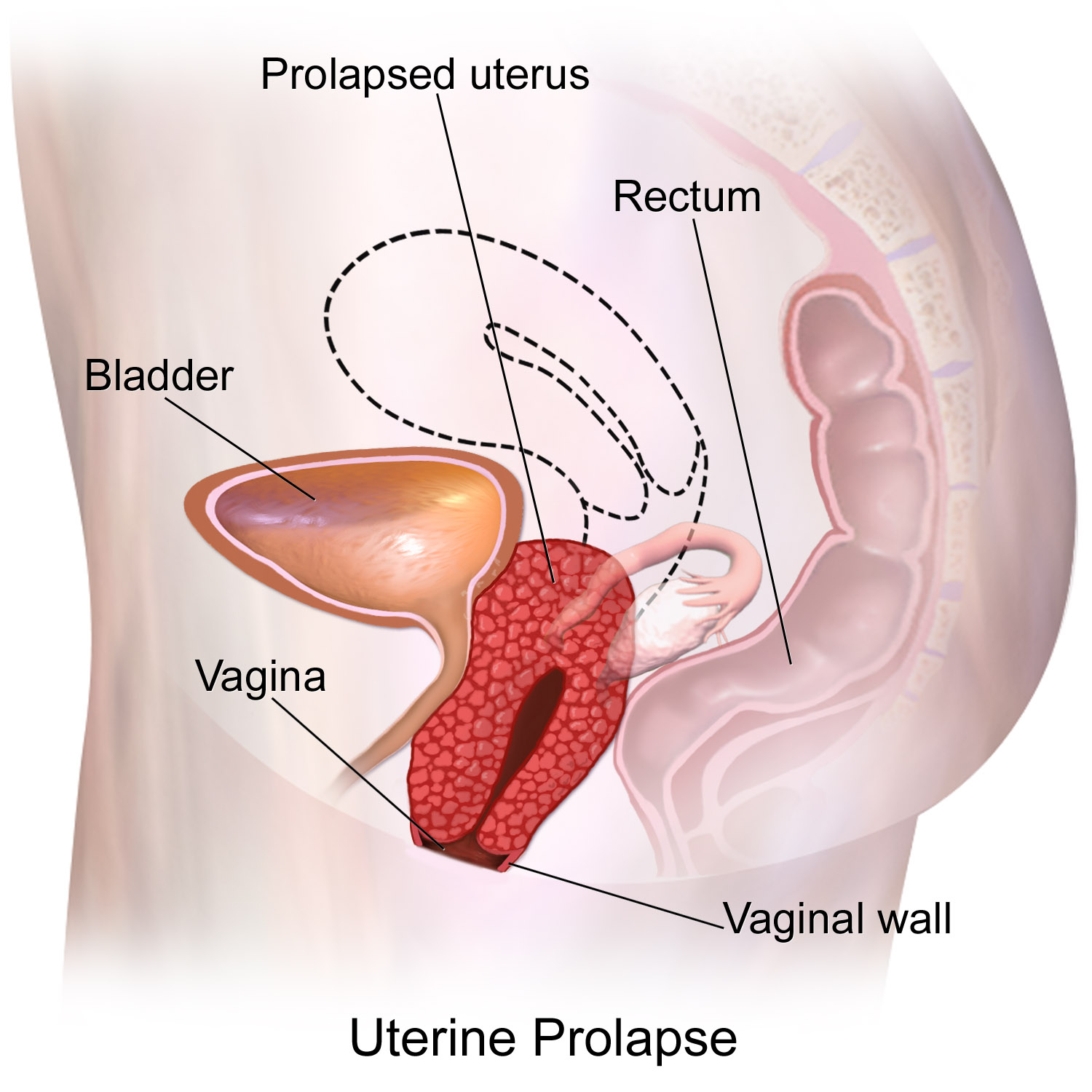
Uterine Prolapse, an example of pelvic organ prolapse (POP)

Transvaginal mesh prevents pelvic organs, such as the bladder, uterus and rectum from sagging into the vagina due to weak pelvic muscles by acting as a hammock underneath. Depending on the organs involved, it can be placed on the anterior, posterior, or top wall of vagina transvaginally. In some special cases of vaginal vault prolapse, the vagina may collapse after the removal of the uterus and a transvaginal mesh can be positioned on top of the vagina to fix it in place.

=== Stress Urinary Incontinence (SUI) Repair ===
Transvaginal mesh, also called bladder sling in this case, holds up the urethra when pelvic muscles weaken. This prevents bladder leakage during physical movements that increases bladder pressure.

Compared to traditional native tissue repair surgery, transvaginal mesh, especially when placed in anterior vaginal area, has improved POP repair outcomes but similar SUI repair outcomes.

Advantages over native tissue repair are mainly associated with improved surgical procedures, for example, simpler and less invasive procedures, higher reproducibility of techniques and durability. However, transvaginal mesh remains as a refuted method due to its adverse complications.

== Technique ==
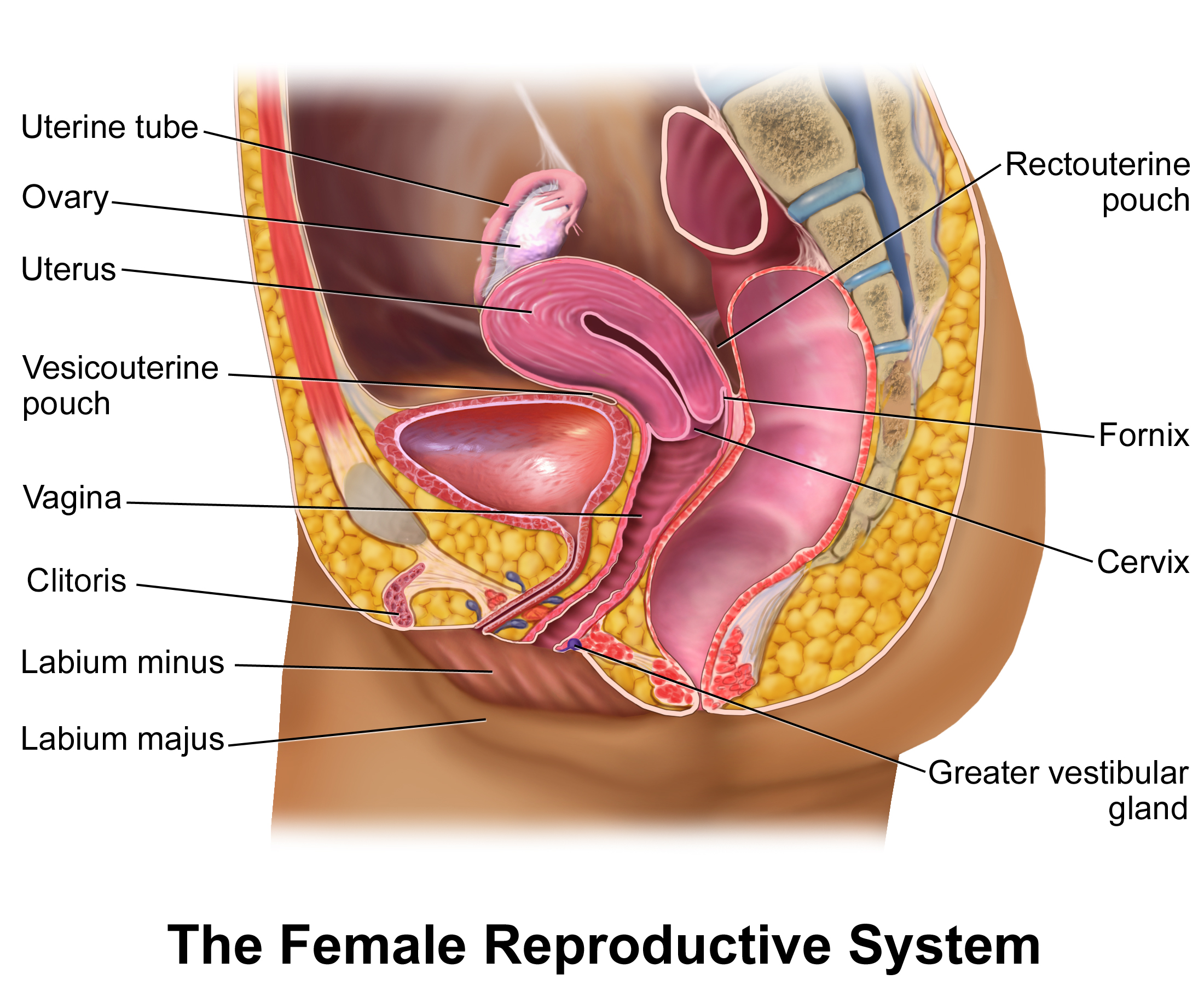
Lateral cross section of female reproductive system, illustrating the vesicovaginal and rectovaginal areas

As pelvic organ prolapse and stress urinary incontinence can be present separately or simultaneously, surgical mesh is implanted into vesicovaginal and rectovaginal region through the vaginal route in different approaches, to manage patients’ condition properly.

=== Pelvic organ prolapse (POP) surgery ===
The goal of POP repair with transvaginal mesh is to increase longevity in patients by reconstructing organ position and preventing pelvic organs from bulging into the vagina. Generally, the position and incisions for transvaginal mesh are determined by the corresponding pelvic muscle defect, which differs from patient to patient.

The implantation usually starts with anterior colpotomy, which is an incision on the anterior vaginal wall to assess the vesicovaginal space in front of the vagina. For patients who have undergone hysterectomy or will be preserving their uterus, only longitudinal anterior incision can be performed. For patients who are also receiving a concomitant hysterectomy, an anterior colpotomy, a Cross-T-shaped incision that cuts around the cervix, or a single incision around the cervix and across the vagina will be performed.

Tissue Fixation System (TFS) invented in Australia, an example of mesh implant to repair pelvic organ prolapse and stress urinary incontinence.

In consideration of the patient's specific conditions, the transvaginal mesh can be positioned in front of the vaginal wall (cystocele correction), behind the vaginal wall (rectocele correction), or on top of the vagina (uterine prolapse correction).

For cystocele corrections, horizontal arms will be inserted on the lateral bladder walls through the obturator foramen by an Emmet needle. Meanwhile, vertical straps will be placed onto the fibrous thickenings of pelvic fascia anteriorly and posteriorly in order to reposition the bladder.

Alternatively, an incision on the posterior vaginal wall will be needed to place the mesh through the perineal skin for rectocele correction. To hold the rectum upright, the horizontal straps are inserted into space surrounding the rectum, brought out of the body and pulled below the anus. If both corrections are required, transvaginal mesh can be cut into two pieces before operation and adjusted for accurate reconstruction. After putting the prolapsed organs back to its original position and reinforcing the vaginal wall, the incision is closed with sutures.

Transvaginal mesh surgery is expected to show improved pelvic support after the first few weeks, particularly for non-absorbable meshes which have a higher biocompatibility and permanent outcome. For absorbable meshes, longer recovery time and lower durability are expected as native tissues need to grow into the pores to support the weakened organs.

=== Stress urinary incontinence (SUI) surgery ===
Transvaginal mesh, also known as midurethral or bladder neck sling for SUI repair, can be used to support the urethra or the neck of the bladder in two surgical approaches, namely the retropubic and transobturator. In the retropubic approach, two incisions above the pubic bone and one incision in the vagina are performed. The transvaginal mesh is then placed under the urethra through the retropubic space, which is anterior to bladder and posterior to pubic symphysis, and brought out to the suprapubic area. In the transobturator approach, two incisions in the groin area and one incision in the vagina are performed. The transvaginal mesh is inserted through the obturator foramen to avoid damage of pelvic organs, and brought out to the skin in the groin area. Since 2008, mini-slings with single vaginal incision have been introduced to reduce complications without compromising the successful rate.

== Complications ==
Intraoperative complications are of low risk and include vaginal or pelvic hematoma, bleeding, rectal injury and bladder injury. In contrast, postoperative complications are most frequent among patients and are mainly related to the mesh. The high incidence of postoperative complications of transvaginal mesh has led to its ban by the FDA in 2019.

=== Mesh erosion ===
Mesh erosion describes the exposure, extrusion or protrusion of the mesh exteriorly at the surgery scar. Generally, it is the most common postoperative complication and 10.3% of the patients experience mesh erosion within 12 months for pelvic organ prolapse (POP) repair. Mesh erosion can be classified into 2 main types according to the location of erosion:

==== Vaginal extrusion ====
Postoperative vaginal extrusion is defined as a mesh extrusion through the vaginal mucosa and is the most common form of mesh erosion. Patients with this complication usually present with discomfort in the vagina as a result of mucosal irritation, abnormal vaginal discharge, or pelvic pain. For sexually active patients, their partners may even feel pain during intercourse, causing notice of the presentation.

The most common site for vaginal extrusion is usually in the midline of the surgical incision site since major causes of vaginal extrusion include suture disruption, subclinical infection and damage at the surrounding tissue.

As vaginal extrusion worsen due to delayed healing, conservative treatment with oestrogen or antibiotics and recommendation for sexual abstinence is usually suggested to alleviate the symptoms. If conservative treatment fails due to large mesh exposure (i.e. > 0.5mm), partial mesh excision is suggested with symptoms expected to resolved in 71-95% of the patients. If partial mesh excision fails, a more invasive complete mesh excision will be considered to avoid further complications, especially for those with severe complications.

==== Erosion into the urethra or bladder ====
Postoperative erosion into the urethra or bladder is less common and presents within 18 month after mesh surgery. Patients with this complication typically show urge incontinence, stress urinary incontinence, urinary retention, hematuria or dysuria.

Complete inspection of urethra by cystoscopy can help diagnose this complication and the mesh must be excised.

=== Pain ===
Postoperative pain is usually experienced at pelvic, groin, thigh region or during sexual intercourse. Furthermore, it can be caused by mesh erosion or subclinical infection. One hypothesised aetiology for mesh-related pain is that inflammatory response induces the shrinkage of mesh, leading to vaginal tightening.

To treat postoperative pain, an examination in the pelvic region is performed to determine the cause of pain. If there are no significant examination findings, pain relief drugs, such as nonsteroidal anti-inflammatory medicine, will be first prescribed to patients. If the pain persists for months, local anesthetics with corticosteroids can be injected at the site of pain. For more severe cases, mesh excision with targeted physical therapy can be considered as a last resort.

=== Pelvic infection ===
Although postoperative infection seldom occur among patients who have undergone mesh surgery, it is still an inherent risk for any surgical implantations and results in severe implications. In cases of severe infection, complete mesh excision is highly commended.

=== Others ===
Other common complications include urinary problems, abnormal bleeding, organ perforation while some rare complications, such as recurrent pelvic organ prolapse, neuro-muscular problems, vaginal scarring and emotional problems are also observed. From 2008 to 2010, three deaths were associated with transvaginal mesh surgery for POP repair due to bowel perforation and abnormal bleeding.

=== Risk factors for complications ===
==== Concomitant surgery ====
The number and extent of concomitant surgeries increase with the complication risks.

However, for patients who require concurrent mesh slings, concomitant hysterectomy is often necessary. Certain incision methods for hysterectomy, such as an inverted T incision, will also increase the risk of complications significantly.

==== Inappropriate surgical techniques ====
The size of the incision and extent of sling tension should be minimized to reduce risk of complications. This is often determined by the surgical skills of surgeons.

=== Protective factors for complications ===
Uterine preservation and minimal incision size should be performed as they prevent damage to the urogenital system.

== History ==
Initially used in the 50s to mend abdominal hernias, gynecologists started to use meshes to repair pelvic organ prolapse (POP) and stress urinary incontinence (SUI) in the 90s. Over time, manufacturers seized the demand for specific mesh with desired shapes for POP and SUI repair, resulting in the first SUI and POP-specific mesh to be cleared by the FDA as class II moderate-risk devices in 1996 and 2002. In 2006, approximately one-third of POP patients opted for mesh implantation, in which over 90% mesh surgeries were performed transvaginally, rather than traditional native tissue repair or with other devices. Due to the popular response, mesh products evolved into surgical mesh kits with the addition of new insertion tools, such as tissue fixation anchors.

Starting from 2008, the FDA took escalating actions to deal with the growing adverse effects and low repair efficacy of transvaginal mesh for POP repair. In 2011, it issued an FDA Safety Communication, pointing out concerns for transvaginal mesh. In 2016, the FDA reclassified transvaginal mesh for POP repair into a class III high-risk device, requiring manufacturers to submit a premarket approval application to keep transvaginal mesh products on the market. After an advisory committee meeting, the FDA announced that the safety and effectiveness of transvaginal mesh for POP are not scientifically assured and all transvaginal mesh products, except midurethral slings, were banned to protect the health of female patients on 16 April 2019.

Currently, there are several legal actions against major transvaginal mesh manufacturers like Johnson & Johnson and Boston Scientific to compensate complications. A class of 700 Australian women sued Johnson & Johnson for selling defective transvaginal meshes. Similar self-claimed victims in the United Kingdom and the United States have sparked off more than 100,000 transvaginal mesh-related lawsuits. Up until now, Johnson & Johnson and Boston Scientific have agreed for payments in total of $8 million to resolve the claims.
