= Excavation =

Excavation means digging into the ground. It may also refer to:

- Archaeological excavation
- Excavation (medicine)
- Excavation (The Haxan Cloak album), 2013
- Excavation (Ben Monder album), 2000
- Excavation (novel), a 2000 novel by James Rollins
- Excavation: A Memoir, a 2014 memoir by Wendy C. Ortiz
- Excavation, a 2003 video game by WildTangent

== See also ==
- Excavate (disambiguation)
- Excavator (disambiguation)
- Excavata, a taxonomic grouping of eukaryotic unicellular organisms
- Celaenia excavata, a spider
