= Excavator (disambiguation) =

Excavators are a type of construction equipment.

Excavator may also refer to:

- Excavator (album), a 2015 album by stephaniesǐd
- Excavator (film), a 2017 South Korean drama film
- Excavator (microarchitecture), a computer microarchitecture developed by AMD
- Excavator (Transformers), a transformer toy

== See also ==
- Excavate (disambiguation)
- Excavation (disambiguation)
