= List of MeSH codes (F01) =

The following is a partial list of the "F" codes for Medical Subject Headings (MeSH), as defined by the United States National Library of Medicine (NLM).

This list continues the information at List of MeSH codes (E07). Codes following these are found at List of MeSH codes (F02). For other MeSH codes, see List of MeSH codes.

The source for this content is the set of 2006 MeSH Trees from the NLM.

== MeSH F01 – behavior and behavior mechanisms ==
=== MeSH F01.058 – adaptation, psychological ===
- MeSH F01.058.288 – feedback, psychological
- MeSH F01.058.577 – orientation

=== MeSH F01.100 – attitude ===
- MeSH F01.100.050 – attitude of health personnel
- MeSH F01.100.100 – attitude to computers
- MeSH F01.100.125 – attitude to death
- MeSH F01.100.150 – attitude to health
- MeSH F01.100.150.500 – health knowledge, attitudes, practice

=== MeSH F01.145 – behavior ===
- MeSH F01.145.015 – accident proneness
- MeSH F01.145.022 – adolescent behavior
- MeSH F01.145.113 – behavior, animal
- MeSH F01.145.113.055 – animal communication
- MeSH F01.145.113.055.400 – echolocation
- MeSH F01.145.113.055.800 – vocalization, animal
- MeSH F01.145.113.083 – animal migration
- MeSH F01.145.113.111 – appetitive behavior
- MeSH F01.145.113.111.453 – grooming
- MeSH F01.145.113.111.600 – predatory behavior
- MeSH F01.145.113.252 – consummatory behavior
- MeSH F01.145.113.252.478 – nesting behavior
- MeSH F01.145.113.252.520 – predatory behavior
- MeSH F01.145.113.252.748 – sex behavior, animal
- MeSH F01.145.113.252.748.200 – copulation
- MeSH F01.145.113.252.748.400 – pair bond
- MeSH F01.145.113.367 – eliminative behavior, animal
- MeSH F01.145.113.448 – escape reaction
- MeSH F01.145.113.547 – feeding behavior
- MeSH F01.145.113.547.200 – cannibalism
- MeSH F01.145.113.555 – freezing reaction, cataleptic
- MeSH F01.145.113.646 – homing behavior
- MeSH F01.145.113.680 – immobility response, tonic
- MeSH F01.145.126 – behavioral symptoms
- MeSH F01.145.126.100 – affective symptoms
- MeSH F01.145.126.125 – aggression
- MeSH F01.145.126.125.100 – agonistic behavior
- MeSH F01.145.126.156 – catatonia
- MeSH F01.145.126.159 – child reactive disorders
- MeSH F01.145.126.175 – coprophagia
- MeSH F01.145.126.200 – delusions
- MeSH F01.145.126.300 – depersonalization
- MeSH F01.145.126.350 – depression
- MeSH F01.145.126.837 – encopresis
- MeSH F01.145.126.856 – enuresis
- MeSH F01.145.126.875 – hearing loss, functional
- MeSH F01.145.126.925 – malingering
- MeSH F01.145.126.937 – mental fatigue
- MeSH F01.145.126.950 – obsessive behavior
- MeSH F01.145.126.962 – paranoid behavior
- MeSH F01.145.126.975 – schizophrenic language
- MeSH F01.145.126.980 – self-injurious behavior
- MeSH F01.145.126.980.750 – self mutilation
- MeSH F01.145.126.980.875 – suicide
- MeSH F01.145.126.980.875.300 – suicide, assisted
- MeSH F01.145.126.980.875.600 – suicide, attempted
- MeSH F01.145.126.990 – stress, psychological
- MeSH F01.145.179 – child behavior
- MeSH F01.145.179.500 – infant behavior
- MeSH F01.145.194 – codependency (psychology)
- MeSH F01.145.209 – communication
- MeSH F01.145.209.213 – communication barriers
- MeSH F01.145.209.259 – disclosure
- MeSH F01.145.209.259.300 – mandatory reporting
- MeSH F01.145.209.259.399 – parental notification
- MeSH F01.145.209.259.800 – truth disclosure
- MeSH F01.145.209.259.800.200 – duty to warn
- MeSH F01.145.209.259.900 – whistleblowing
- MeSH F01.145.209.329 – duty to recontact
- MeSH F01.145.209.364 – information dissemination
- MeSH F01.145.209.381 – interdisciplinary communication
- MeSH F01.145.209.399 – language
- MeSH F01.145.209.459 – narration
- MeSH F01.145.209.520 – negotiating
- MeSH F01.145.209.530 – nonverbal communication
- MeSH F01.145.209.530.136 – blushing
- MeSH F01.145.209.530.258 – crying
- MeSH F01.145.209.530.385 – facial expression
- MeSH F01.145.209.530.385.671 – smiling
- MeSH F01.145.209.530.538 – kinesics
- MeSH F01.145.209.530.538.445 – gestures
- MeSH F01.145.209.530.614 – laughter
- MeSH F01.145.209.530.702 – manual communication
- MeSH F01.145.209.530.702.668 – sign language
- MeSH F01.145.209.631 – persuasive communication
- MeSH F01.145.209.729 – propaganda
- MeSH F01.145.209.908 – verbal behavior
- MeSH F01.145.209.908.677 – speech
- MeSH F01.145.209.908.677.610 – speech intelligibility
- MeSH F01.145.317 – drinking behavior
- MeSH F01.145.317.269 – alcohol drinking
- MeSH F01.145.367 – escape reaction
- MeSH F01.145.387 – exploratory behavior
- MeSH F01.145.407 – feeding behavior
- MeSH F01.145.407.400 – fasting
- MeSH F01.145.407.432 – food habits
- MeSH F01.145.407.516 – food preferences
- MeSH F01.145.466 – habits
- MeSH F01.145.466.263 – fingersucking
- MeSH F01.145.466.349 – food habits
- MeSH F01.145.466.554 – nail biting
- MeSH F01.145.466.753 – smoking
- MeSH F01.145.466.753.488 – marijuana smoking
- MeSH F01.145.466.874 – tongue habits
- MeSH F01.145.477 – harm reduction
- MeSH F01.145.488 – health behavior
- MeSH F01.145.488.500 – patient compliance
- MeSH F01.145.488.700 – self-examination
- MeSH F01.145.488.700.100 – breast self-examination
- MeSH F01.145.488.800 – treatment refusal
- MeSH F01.145.510 – imitative behavior
- MeSH F01.145.527 – impulsive behavior
- MeSH F01.145.527.100 – compulsive behavior
- MeSH F01.145.527.100.120 – behavior, addictive
- MeSH F01.145.544 – inhibition (psychology)
- MeSH F01.145.544.538 – proactive inhibition
- MeSH F01.145.544.724 – reactive inhibition
- MeSH F01.145.632 – motor activity
- MeSH F01.145.632.555 – freezing reaction, cataleptic
- MeSH F01.145.632.680 – immobility response, tonic
- MeSH F01.145.677 – personal satisfaction
- MeSH F01.145.688 – reproductive behavior
- MeSH F01.145.688.500 – contraception behavior
- MeSH F01.145.699 – risk reduction behavior
- MeSH F01.145.722 – risk-taking
- MeSH F01.145.722.408 – gambling
- MeSH F01.145.775 – self stimulation
- MeSH F01.145.802 – sexual behavior
- MeSH F01.145.802.188 – coitus
- MeSH F01.145.802.188.300 – coitus interruptus
- MeSH F01.145.802.279 – courtship
- MeSH F01.145.802.295 – extramarital relations
- MeSH F01.145.802.526 – masturbation
- MeSH F01.145.802.790 – prostitution
- MeSH F01.145.802.845 – safe sex
- MeSH F01.145.802.900 – sexual abstinence
- MeSH F01.145.802.950 – sexual harassment
- MeSH F01.145.802.975 – sexuality
- MeSH F01.145.802.975.200 – bisexuality
- MeSH F01.145.802.975.400 – heterosexuality
- MeSH F01.145.802.975.500 – homosexuality
- MeSH F01.145.802.975.500.400 – homosexuality, female
- MeSH F01.145.802.975.500.600 – homosexuality, male
- MeSH F01.145.813 – social behavior
- MeSH F01.145.813.045 – aggression
- MeSH F01.145.813.090 – altruism
- MeSH F01.145.813.093 – anomie
- MeSH F01.145.813.097 – ceremonial behavior
- MeSH F01.145.813.105 – competitive behavior
- MeSH F01.145.813.115 – cooperative behavior
- MeSH F01.145.813.157 – deception
- MeSH F01.145.813.191 – dehumanization
- MeSH F01.145.813.191.250 – commodification
- MeSH F01.145.813.208 – gift giving
- MeSH F01.145.813.225 – helping behavior
- MeSH F01.145.813.527 – mass behavior
- MeSH F01.145.813.546 – permissiveness
- MeSH F01.145.813.555 – professional misconduct
- MeSH F01.145.813.565 – rejection (psychology)
- MeSH F01.145.813.572 – scapegoating
- MeSH F01.145.813.617 – shyness
- MeSH F01.145.813.621 – social adjustment
- MeSH F01.145.813.625 – social conformity
- MeSH F01.145.813.628 – social desirability
- MeSH F01.145.813.630 – social distance
- MeSH F01.145.813.650 – social dominance
- MeSH F01.145.813.650.400 – dominance-subordination
- MeSH F01.145.813.655 – social facilitation
- MeSH F01.145.813.708 – social identification
- MeSH F01.145.813.781 – social isolation
- MeSH F01.145.813.854 – stereotyping
- MeSH F01.145.875 – spatial behavior
- MeSH F01.145.875.281 – crowding
- MeSH F01.145.875.596 – personal space
- MeSH F01.145.875.864 – territoriality
- MeSH F01.145.896 – stereotyped behavior
- MeSH F01.145.916 – sucking behavior
- MeSH F01.145.940 – tobacco use cessation
- MeSH F01.145.940.700 – smoking cessation

=== MeSH F01.318 – child rearing ===
- MeSH F01.318.709 – toilet training

=== MeSH F01.393 – defense mechanisms ===
- MeSH F01.393.047 – acting out
- MeSH F01.393.200 – denial (psychology)
- MeSH F01.393.246 – displacement (psychology)
- MeSH F01.393.246.250 – cathexis
- MeSH F01.393.246.500 – scapegoating
- MeSH F01.393.351 – fantasy
- MeSH F01.393.398 – helplessness, learned
- MeSH F01.393.446 – identification (psychology)
- MeSH F01.393.446.250 – gender identity
- MeSH F01.393.628 – perceptual defense
- MeSH F01.393.693 – projection
- MeSH F01.393.693.500 – scapegoating
- MeSH F01.393.746 – rationalization
- MeSH F01.393.784 – regression (psychology)
- MeSH F01.393.821 – repression
- MeSH F01.393.821.645 – repression-sensitization
- MeSH F01.393.898 – sublimation

=== MeSH F01.470 – emotions ===
- MeSH F01.470.047 – affect
- MeSH F01.470.047.110 – irritable mood
- MeSH F01.470.093 – anger
- MeSH F01.470.093.640 – rage
- MeSH F01.470.132 – anxiety
- MeSH F01.470.132.150 – anxiety, castration
- MeSH F01.470.132.150.500 – koro (penis panic)
- MeSH F01.470.132.300 – dental anxiety
- MeSH F01.470.142 – bereavement
- MeSH F01.470.142.110 – grief
- MeSH F01.470.192 – boredom
- MeSH F01.470.323 – euphoria
- MeSH F01.470.342 – expressed emotion
- MeSH F01.470.361 – fear
- MeSH F01.470.361.300 – dental anxiety
- MeSH F01.470.361.585 – panic
- MeSH F01.470.405 – frustration
- MeSH F01.470.483 – guilt
- MeSH F01.470.483.666 – shame
- MeSH F01.470.516 – happiness
- MeSH F01.470.548 – hate
- MeSH F01.470.596 – hostility
- MeSH F01.470.653 – jealousy
- MeSH F01.470.693 – laughter
- MeSH F01.470.713 – loneliness
- MeSH F01.470.734 – love

=== MeSH F01.525 – human development ===
- MeSH F01.525.049 – adolescent development
- MeSH F01.525.200 – child development
- MeSH F01.525.200.310 – language development
- MeSH F01.525.200.310.250 – child language
- MeSH F01.525.200.310.300 – crying

=== MeSH F01.658 – motivation ===
- MeSH F01.658.059 – achievement
- MeSH F01.658.100 – aspirations (psychology)
- MeSH F01.658.209 – conflict (psychology)
- MeSH F01.658.293 – drive
- MeSH F01.658.293.391 – hunger
- MeSH F01.658.293.787 – thirst
- MeSH F01.658.370 – exploratory behavior
- MeSH F01.658.433 – food deprivation
- MeSH F01.658.500 – goals
- MeSH F01.658.556 – handling (psychology)
- MeSH F01.658.642 – instinct
- MeSH F01.658.650 – intention
- MeSH F01.658.780 – power (psychology)
- MeSH F01.658.938 – water deprivation

=== MeSH F01.700 – neurobehavioral manifestations ===
- MeSH F01.700.080 – apraxias
- MeSH F01.700.080.500 – gait apraxia
- MeSH F01.700.165 – catatonia
- MeSH F01.700.250 – confusion
- MeSH F01.700.250.500 – delirium
- MeSH F01.700.315 – consciousness disorders
- MeSH F01.700.625 – memory disorders
- MeSH F01.700.625.100 – amnesia
- MeSH F01.700.625.100.075 – amnesia, anterograde
- MeSH F01.700.625.100.150 – amnesia, retrograde
- MeSH F01.700.625.100.800 – amnesia, transient global
- MeSH F01.700.625.400 – korsakoff syndrome
- MeSH F01.700.687 – mental retardation
- MeSH F01.700.750 – perceptual disorders
- MeSH F01.700.750.100 – agnosia
- MeSH F01.700.750.100.300 – gerstmann syndrome
- MeSH F01.700.750.100.650 – prosopagnosia
- MeSH F01.700.750.200 – auditory perceptual disorders
- MeSH F01.700.750.300 – hallucinations
- MeSH F01.700.750.400 – illusions
- MeSH F01.700.750.700 – phantom limb
- MeSH F01.700.875 – psychomotor disorders
- MeSH F01.700.875.350 – apraxias
- MeSH F01.700.875.350.200 – apraxia, ideomotor
- MeSH F01.700.875.700 – psychomotor agitation

=== MeSH F01.752 – personality ===
- MeSH F01.752.049 – assertiveness
- MeSH F01.752.098 – authoritarianism
- MeSH F01.752.190 – character
- MeSH F01.752.264 – creativeness
- MeSH F01.752.330 – dependency (psychology)
- MeSH F01.752.355 – empathy
- MeSH F01.752.488 – individuality
- MeSH F01.752.543 – intelligence
- MeSH F01.752.609 – leadership
- MeSH F01.752.650 – machiavellianism
- MeSH F01.752.698 – negativism
- MeSH F01.752.747 – personality development
- MeSH F01.752.747.189 – ego
- MeSH F01.752.747.189.508 – reality testing
- MeSH F01.752.747.246 – extraversion (psychology)
- MeSH F01.752.747.347 – id
- MeSH F01.752.747.385 – identification (psychology)
- MeSH F01.752.747.385.200 – gender identity
- MeSH F01.752.747.423 – identity crisis
- MeSH F01.752.747.466 – individuation
- MeSH F01.752.747.511 – introversion (psychology)
- MeSH F01.752.747.616 – moral development
- MeSH F01.752.747.722 – psychosexual development
- MeSH F01.752.747.722.200 – gender identity
- MeSH F01.752.747.722.458 – latency period (psychology)
- MeSH F01.752.747.722.626 – oral stage
- MeSH F01.752.747.792 – self concept
- MeSH F01.752.747.792.537 – self assessment (psychology)
- MeSH F01.752.747.792.662 – self disclosure
- MeSH F01.752.747.792.700 – self efficacy
- MeSH F01.752.747.859 – superego
- MeSH F01.752.747.880 – type a personality
- MeSH F01.752.747.930 – unconscious (psychology)
- MeSH F01.752.898 – temperament

=== MeSH F01.829 – psychology, social ===
- MeSH F01.829.131 – double bind interaction
- MeSH F01.829.263 – family
- MeSH F01.829.263.065 – adult children
- MeSH F01.829.263.132 – birth order
- MeSH F01.829.263.315 – family characteristics
- MeSH F01.829.263.315.500 – marital status
- MeSH F01.829.263.315.500.300 – divorce
- MeSH F01.829.263.315.500.500 – marriage
- MeSH F01.829.263.315.500.725 – single person
- MeSH F01.829.263.315.500.725.700 – single parent
- MeSH F01.829.263.315.500.862 – widowhood
- MeSH F01.829.263.370 – family relations
- MeSH F01.829.263.370.110 – intergenerational relations
- MeSH F01.829.263.370.215 – maternal behavior
- MeSH F01.829.263.370.215.500 – maternal-fetal relations
- MeSH F01.829.263.370.240 – maternal deprivation
- MeSH F01.829.263.370.290 – parent-child relations
- MeSH F01.829.263.370.290.110 – father-child relations
- MeSH F01.829.263.370.290.170 – mother-child relations
- MeSH F01.829.263.370.310 – parenting
- MeSH F01.829.263.370.330 – paternal behavior
- MeSH F01.829.263.370.380 – paternal deprivation
- MeSH F01.829.263.370.450 – sibling relations
- MeSH F01.829.263.500 – nuclear family
- MeSH F01.829.263.500.280 – only child
- MeSH F01.829.263.500.320 – parents
- MeSH F01.829.263.500.320.100 – fathers
- MeSH F01.829.263.500.320.200 – mothers
- MeSH F01.829.263.500.320.785 – single parent
- MeSH F01.829.263.500.320.892 – surrogate mothers
- MeSH F01.829.263.500.490 – siblings
- MeSH F01.829.263.500.660 – spouses
- MeSH F01.829.263.750 – single-parent family
- MeSH F01.829.316 – group processes
- MeSH F01.829.316.068 – scientific consensus
- MeSH F01.829.316.137 – focus groups
- MeSH F01.829.316.274 – group structure
- MeSH F01.829.316.483 – peer group
- MeSH F01.829.316.549 – peer review
- MeSH F01.829.316.549.690 – peer review, health care
- MeSH F01.829.316.549.700 – peer review, research
- MeSH F01.829.316.616 – role
- MeSH F01.829.316.616.625 – professional role
- MeSH F01.829.316.616.625.450 – nurse's role
- MeSH F01.829.316.616.625.600 – physician's role
- MeSH F01.829.316.616.751 – sick role
- MeSH F01.829.316.697 – sensitivity training groups
- MeSH F01.829.316.777 – social distance
- MeSH F01.829.379 – internal-external control
- MeSH F01.829.401 – interpersonal relations
- MeSH F01.829.401.094 – dissent and disputes
- MeSH F01.829.401.190 – intergenerational relations
- MeSH F01.829.401.205 – interprofessional relations
- MeSH F01.829.401.205.249 – interdisciplinary communication
- MeSH F01.829.401.205.500 – physician-nurse relations
- MeSH F01.829.401.520 – negotiating
- MeSH F01.829.401.550 – professional-family relations
- MeSH F01.829.401.650 – professional-patient relations
- MeSH F01.829.401.650.410 – dentist-patient relations
- MeSH F01.829.401.650.600 – nurse-patient relations
- MeSH F01.829.401.650.675 – physician-patient relations
- MeSH F01.829.401.650.837 – researcher-subject relations
- MeSH F01.829.401.825 – trust
- MeSH F01.829.458 – life style
- MeSH F01.829.458.410 – life change events
- MeSH F01.829.477 – morale
- MeSH F01.829.500 – morals
- MeSH F01.829.500.359 – conscience
- MeSH F01.829.500.519 – ethics
- MeSH F01.829.500.679 – moral development
- MeSH F01.829.500.840 – virtues
- MeSH F01.829.547 – paternalism
- MeSH F01.829.595 – prejudice
- MeSH F01.829.628 – psychosocial deprivation
- MeSH F01.829.873 – social values

The list continues at List of MeSH codes (F02).
