= Renal fascia =

Tissue

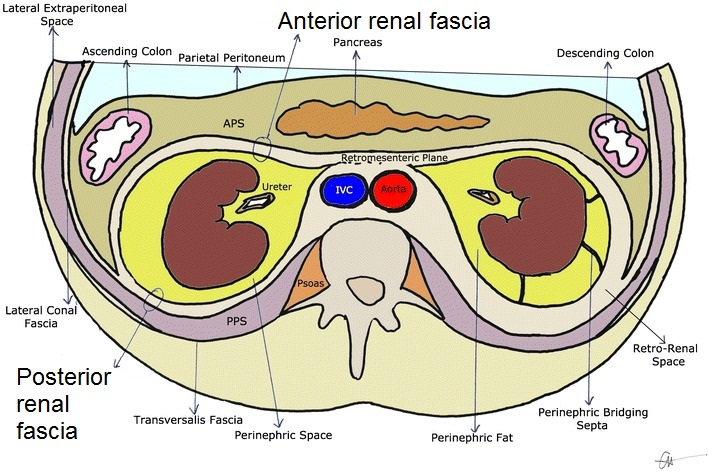
- Transverse plane through the kidneys, showing anterior and posterior renal fascia

Details
- System: Urinary system

Identifiers
- Latin: fascia renalis
- TA98: A08.1.01.010
- TA2: 3819
- FMA: 18104

The renal fascia is a dense, elastic connective tissue envelope enclosing the kidney and adrenal gland, together with the layer of perirenal fat surrounding these two.

The renal fascia separates the adipose capsule of kidney from the overlying pararenal fat. The deeper layers deep to the renal fascia are, in order, the adipose capsule (or perirenal fat), the renal capsule and finally the parenchyma of the renal cortex. At the renal hilum, the renal capsule extends into the renal sinus.

The renal fascia was originally described as consisting of two distinct structures: the anterior renal fascia (Gerota's fascia), and posterior renal fascia (Zuckerkandl's fascia); these two fasciae were said to fuse laterally to form the lateroconal fascia. Understanding of the structure of the renal fascia has subsequently evolved.

== Additional images ==
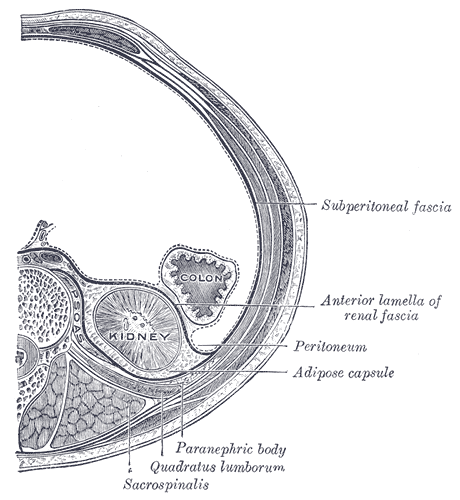
Transverse section, showing the relations of the capsule of the kidney.

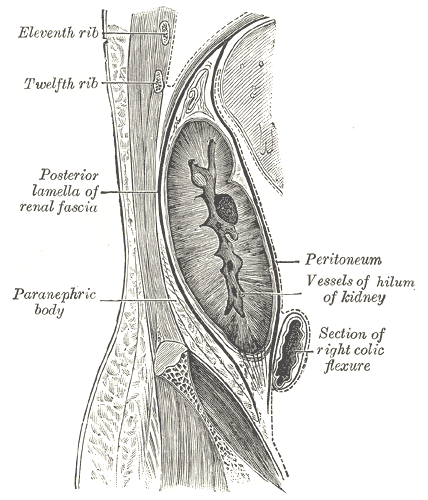
Sagittal section through posterior abdominal wall, showing the relations of the capsule of the kidney.
