= Culdoscope =

Medical instrument

- Purpose: visualize female pelvic organs

Culdoscope is an instrument, a kind of endoscope, used to visualize female pelvic organs, introduced through the vagina into the cul-de-sac (which is also called the rectouterine pouch or the pouch of Douglas). The procedure of inserting the culdoscope into the rectouterine pouch is termed culdoscopy.

The word culdoscope (and culdoscopy) is derived from the phrase cul-de-sac, which in French literally means "bottom of a sac", here referring to a blind pouch or cavity in the female body that is closed at one end, that is the rectouterine pouch. As early as the 13th century, a cul-de-sac was a dead-end street (or a dead-end way), a blind alley.
