= Frey's procedure =

Surgical treatment for chronic pancreatitis

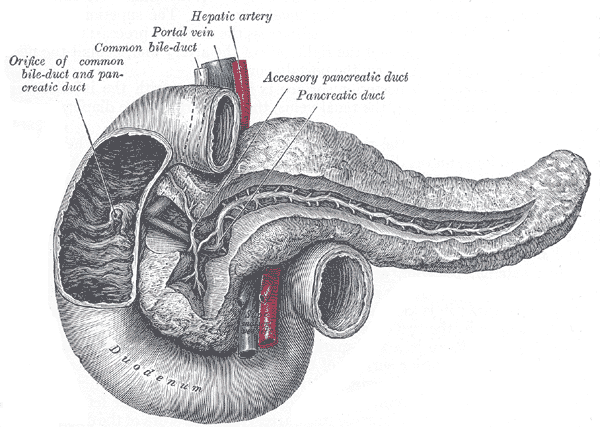
Pancreas

Frey's procedure is a surgical technique used in the treatment of chronic pancreatitis in which the diseased portions of the pancreas head are cored out. A lateral pancreaticojejunostomy (LRLPJ) is then performed in which a loop of the jejunum is then mobilized and attached over the exposed pancreatic duct to allow better drainage of the pancreas, including its head.

== Indication ==
Frey's operation is indicated on patients with chronic pancreatitis who have "head dominant" disease.

== Comparison to Puestow procedure ==
Compared with a Puestow procedure, a Frey's procedure allows for better drainage of the pancreatic head.

== Complications ==
Postoperative complications after LRLPJ are usually septic in nature and are likely to occur more often in patients in whom endoscopic pancreatic stenting has been performed before surgical intervention. Pancreatic endocrine insufficiency occurs in 60% of patients.

== Eponym ==
It is named for the American surgeon Charles Frederick Frey (b.1929) of Michigan, who first described it in 1987. Dr Frey died on February 7, 2022
