= Culdocentesis =

Surgical procedure to extract fluid from the rectouterine pouch

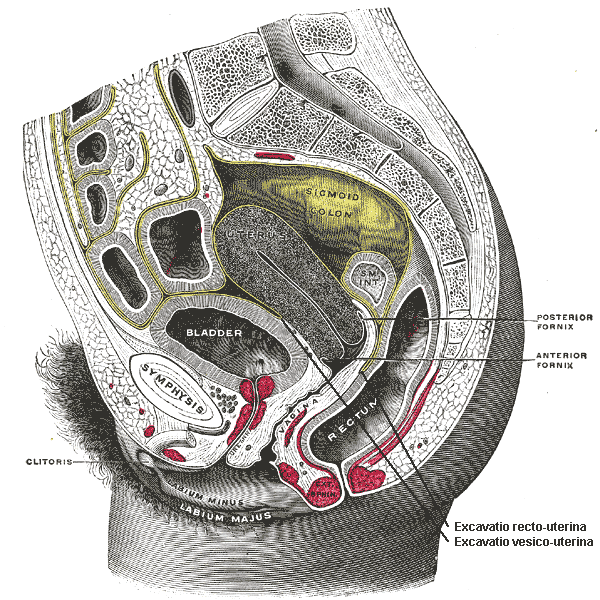
- Sagittal section of the lower part of a female trunk, right segment. (Pouch of Douglas labeled at bottom right.)
- Specialty: Gynaecology
- ICD-9-CM: 70.0
- MedlinePlus: 003919

Culdocentesis is a medical procedure involving the extraction of fluid from the rectouterine pouch (pouch of Douglas) posterior to the vagina through a needle. It can be one diagnostic technique used in identifying pelvic inflammatory disease (in which case purulent fluid will be extracted) and ruptured ectopic pregnancies that cause hemoperitoneum.

In the procedure, the rectouterine pouch is often reached through the posterior fornix of the vagina. The process of creating the hole is called colpotomy if a scalpel incision is made to drain the fluid rather than using a needle.

== See also ==
- Amniocentesis
- Colposcopy
- Culdoscopy
