= Psychomotor =

Psychomotor may refer to:

- Psychomotor learning, the relationship between cognitive functions and physical movement
- Psychomotor retardation, a slowing-down of thought and a reduction of physical movements in an individual
- Psychomotor agitation, a series of unintentional and purposeless motions that stem from mental tension and anxiety of an individual
