= Mediastinoscopy =

Procedure that enables visualization of the contents of the mediastinum

- ICD-9-CM: 34.22
- MeSH: D008481
- OPS-301 code: 1-691.1

Mediastinoscopy is a procedure that enables visualization of the contents of the mediastinum, usually for the purpose of obtaining a biopsy. Mediastinoscopy is often used for staging of lymph nodes of lung cancer or for diagnosing other conditions affecting structures in the mediastinum such as sarcoidosis or lymphoma.

Mediastinoscopy involves making an incision approximately 1 cm above the suprasternal notch of the sternum, or breast bone. Dissection is carried out down to the pretracheal space and down to the carina. A scope (mediastinoscope) is then advanced into the created tunnel which provides a view of the mediastinum. The scope may provide direct visualization or may be attached to a video monitor.

Mediastinoscopy provides access to mediastinal lymph node levels 2, 4, and 7.

== Current use ==
Historically, mediastinoscopy has been the gold standard for the staging of lung cancer. However, with advances in minimally invasive procedures and imaging, mediastinoscopy usage has declined significantly from 2006 to 2010.

== Extended mediastinoscopy ==
Extended mediastinoscopy is a technique which allows access to the pre-aortic (station 6) and aortopulmonary window (station 5) lymph nodes.

== Parasternal mediastinotomy ==
Parasternal mediastinotomy, aka, a Chamberlain procedure, is the standard approach to access lymph nodes at stations 5 and 6.
