= Peritoneovenous shunt =

Shunt which drains peritoneal fluid from the peritoneum into veins

- MeSH: D010536

A peritoneovenous shunt is a shunt which drains peritoneal fluid from the peritoneum into a large vein, usually the internal jugular vein. It is sometimes used in patients with refractory ascites.

It is a long tube with a one-way valve running subcutaneously from the peritoneum to the internal jugular vein in the neck, which allows ascitic fluid to pass directly into the systemic circulation. Various models exist, among which the LeVeen shunt and the Denver shunt.

Possible complications include:

1. Infection
2. Superior vena caval thrombosis
3. Pulmonary edema
4. Bleeding from varices
5. Disseminated intravascular coagulation
