= Scanning fiber endoscope =

A scanning fiber endoscope is a technology that uses a flexible, small (< 6Fr) peripheral or coronary catheter to provide wide-field, high-quality, full-color, laser-based video imaging. These differences distinguish SFE applications from current imaging approaches such as IVUS and Intracoronary OCT. Applications for the device (which was pending FDA review and approval as of 2017), are expected to include medical diagnosis and support in determining interventional treatments such as surgery or biopsy. Providing both full-color images and a wide-field, real-time surgical view into the inner depths of arteries, enables physicians to circumnavigate hard to reach internal tissues to assess for potential disease.

== Methods ==
The SFE technology was developed at the University of Washington for the purpose of providing high-quality laser-based imaging within an ultrathin and flexible endoscope. It is believed that the concept of moving an optical fiber to produce 2D images with confocal sectioning and laser illumination was first proposed for endoscopic applications by Giniunas et al., in 1993. A major advancement of the SFE is rapid scanning and generation of high-quality images using an amplitude-modulated resonating fiber.

Using a single-mode fiber that vibrates in resonance, the SFE scans over tissue highlighted by a focused laser spot. A detector records the time-multiplexed backscatter signal. To access hard to reach arterial areas, the SFE fiber and tube are extremely small. The piezoelectric tube is 400-micron in diameter and this houses the single mode optical fiber. The fiber tip is driven by the tube and has a current resonance frequency of 5 kHz which spirals in an expanding pattern of 250 spirals (500-pixel diameter image) at a frame rate of 15 Hertz. The 1.06 mm diameter distal tip houses the lens system, which determines the imaging parameters. Prototype systems provide a 70-degree field-of-view and 10-micron resolution. Laser sources are coupled into the single scanning fiber and they use red, green, and blue lasers to create color images. To collect backscattered light, twelve 250 micron multimode fibers are placed around the periphery of the micro scanner, creating a 1.6 mm distal tip.

== Advantages ==
Most medical imaging of internal organs is segmented into two groups:

1. X-ray computed tomography (CT) magnetic resonance imaging (MRI), and ultrasound, which are used to image structures and typically, at low spatiotemporal resolution (millimeters, seconds); and
2. optical endoscope technologies, which are used to image surfaces at high spatiotemporal resolution (micrometers, milliseconds).

Endoscopic imaging requires direct visualization of internal organ surfaces. This means both illumination and detection components need to navigate through often extremely challenging anatomy to see a specific area Both the size and flexibility- of the endoscope dictate the ability to access these regions. Endoscopes that are smaller in diameter and highly flexible, can reduce tissue trauma, sedation medication used for sedation, and patient pain.

The ability to achieve clear resolution while significantly reducing the device diameter to enhance arterial navigation is an SFE advantage. Current flexible endoscope technologies using 1 mm coherent fiber bundling technologies are about the same thickness as a human finger. When these devices are reduced in size, they suffer severe resolution degradation, resulting in an image quality that equates to legal blindness for the clinician using them.

== Disadvantages ==
All flexible endoscope designs are limited by the diffraction of light. The objective lens and the illumination properties both determine the spatial point spread function (PSF) imparted on the image. The PSF in endoscopes has the greatest impact are the inside the device at the real focal plane. In the FOV application the limited area within the device and the resolvable separation between points can be used to calculate the image resolution.

== Clinical applications ==
=== Coronary ===
There are 800,000 Chronic Total Occlusions (CTO) per year in the USA. Due to difficulty, only 25% of these occlusions receive therapy [100]. Per the CDC, in 2010 there were 4.5M procedures for viewing the coronary artery, including 454,000 stent replacements; 500,000 balloon angioplasty/stent/coronary procedures; 1M coronary catheterizations.

=== Stroke ===
Recent successes in acute stroke care are driving the need for every stroke center to perform endovascular reperfusion interventions. In the US, 500,000 endovascular reperfusions interventions are performed annually.

The SFE provides the interventionist with a real-time view of stent deployments, and assessment of opposition, stent strut symmetry, side branch interaction, dissection, thrombus formation.

Expected diagnostic applications include plaque luminal characterization for better device selection, endothelization of prior placed stents.

SFE may also enable the interventionist to use less angiography – the angiography would be used as a roadmap, and the SFE to assist in wiring the vessel, see the proximal surface of totally occluded vessels and other unique vascular nuances.

== Safety ==
Use of SFE in place of current methods can help to reduce these current occupational hazards:

- Reduces operator back pain by eliminating the use of heavy lead aprons
- Reduces X-ray radiation risk for patient and operator by decreasing the need for x-rays
- Reduces patient kidney risks by diminishing the use of iodine contrast
