= Angioscopy =

Medical technique for visualizing the interior of blood vessels

- ICD-9-CM: 38.22
- MeSH: D017546
- OPS-301 code: 1-279.9

Angioscopy is a medical technique for visualizing the interior of blood vessels. In this technique, a flexible fibre-bundle endoscope catheter is inserted directly into an artery. It can be helpful in diagnosing such as arterial embolism). Angioscopy is also used as an adjunctive procedure during vascular bypass to visualize valves within venous conduits. The instrument used to perform angioscopy is called an angioscope. Scanning Fiber Endoscope (SFE) is an emerging technology which provides much higher resolution imaging, whilst maintaining a small form factor and flexibility.

Coronary artery angioscopy, which first was used to reveal the presence of a blood clot in the coronary arteries of patients with unstable angina and myocardial infarction, is now widely used in catherization laboratories to visualize stents.
