= Culdoscopy =

Examination of female pelvic organs through the vaginal wall

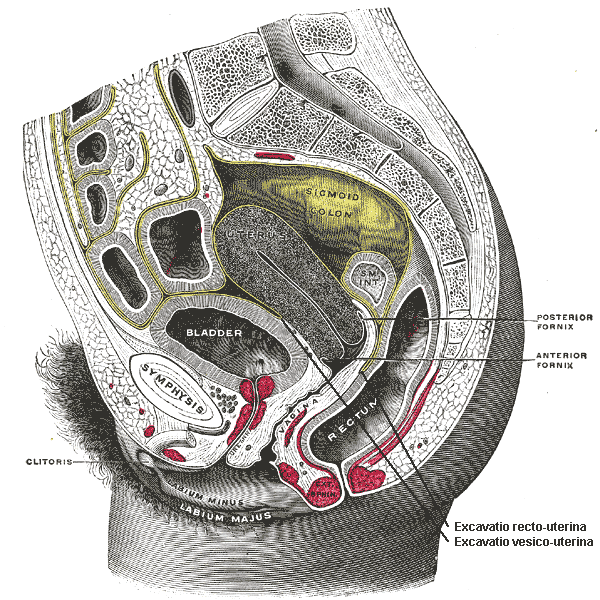
- Sagittal section of the lower part of a female trunk, right segment. (Pouch of Douglas labeled at bottom right.)
- ICD-9-CM: 70.22
- MeSH: D003464
- OPS-301 code: 1-696

Culdoscopy is an endoscopic procedure performed to examine the rectouterine pouch and pelvic viscera by the introduction of a culdoscope through the posterior vaginal wall. The word culdoscopy (and culdoscope) is derived from the term cul-de-sac, which means literally in French "bottom of a sac", and refers to the rectouterine pouch (or called the pouch of Douglas).

The culdoscope is a non-flexible endoscope, basically a modified laparoscope. A trocar is first inserted through the vagina into the posterior cul-de-sac, the space behind the cervix, allowing then the entry of the culdoscope. Due to the position of the patient intestines fall away from the pelvic organs which can then be inspected. Conditions diagnosable by culdoscopy include tubal adhesions (causing sterility), ectopic pregnancy, and salpingitis. Culdoscopy allows the performance of minor procedures such as tubal sterilization.

Culdoscopy is performed with the patient in a knee chest position under local or general anesthesia. There is no insufflation of the abdomen as necessary in laparoscopy. There is no abdominal incision, the entry point in the vagina is closed with a suture.

The procedure was inaugurated by Albert Decker in 1939 and became popular after his reported experience in 1944. Decker had his culdoscope made by American Cystoscope Makers (ACM). He published a textbook about culdoscopy in 1952. The use of culdoscopy faded in the 1970s as the laparoscopic approach was recognized to be superior due to technological advancements.
