= Tooth replantation =

Reinsertion or replacement of an avulsed or luxated tooth

Tooth replantation is any of several forms of restorative dentistry in which an avulsed or luxated tooth is either reinserted and secured into its socket (through a combination of dental procedures) or replaced with another tooth. The purposes of tooth replantation is to resolve tooth loss and preserve the natural landscape of the teeth.

In the modern context, mentions of tooth replantation most often refer to reattachment of an avulsed or luxated permanent tooth into its original socket. Transplantation options also exist. Allotransplantation of a tooth involves it being transferred from one individual to another individual of the same species. It is a largely defunct practice due to the improvements made within the field of dentistry and due to the risks and complications involved including the transmission of diseases such as syphilis, histocompatibility, as well as the low success rate of the procedure, has resulted in its practice being largely abandoned. Autotransplantation of a tooth, otherwise known as intentional replantation in dentistry, is defined as the surgical movement of a tooth from one site on an individual to another location in the same individual. While rare, modern dentistry uses replantation as a form of proactive care to prevent future complications and protect the natural dentition in cases where root canal and surgical endodontic treatments are problematic.

== History ==
One of the first recorded surgeries with details on tooth replantation was made by Ambroise Paré in 1962. However, earlier dental interventions of this nature documented in the 11th century ad were made by Abulcasis, who described replantation and use of ligatures to splint the replanted tooth. The earliest instances of tooth replantation, however, can be traced back to ancient Egypt, where slaves were forced to give their teeth to the pharaoh. Tooth replantation saw further usage within the 17th and 18th century Europe, becoming popular nearing the end of the 18th century most often in the form of allotransplantation. In many cases, older wealthy patients whose teeth had decayed often paid poor people to have their teeth removed to be replanted in their own mouths. Another instance of a similar situation occurred during the Napoleonic wars, where soldiers were forced to donate their teeth to the officers who had lost theirs in battle. In 1685, Charles Allen wrote of tooth transplantation in the first English dental textbook, The Operator for the Teeth, and encouraged the replantation of teeth from animals as he considered it to be "inhumane" to source them from people. In 1890, Scheff J. Die highlighted the role of the periodontal ligament in long term prognosis of replanted teeth. In 1955, Hammer H. highlighted the importance of leaving an intact PDL on intentionally replanted teeth. In 1974, Cvek M, Hollender L and Nord CE showed that the removal of the dental pulp following replantation was required to prevent root resorption and also demonstrated that storage of knocked out teeth in saline could improve the success of replanted teeth.

== Procedure ==
Dental avulsions are a dental emergency and replantations are generally performed by either dentists, endodontists, or oral surgeons.

=== Diagnosis ===
A graphical representation of the periodontal fibres found in the tooth

Prior to implantation the suitability of the avulsed tooth and the gum must be assessed to determine the correct procedure for tooth implantation.

=== Process ===
Prior to the beginning of the procedure, a local anaesthetic should be administered to both the palatal & lingual tissues to numb the surrounding area and minimise discomfort. Gentle irrigation with a saline solution should be performed on the tooth to remove blood clots and possible contaminants from the tooth. Following preparation, any injury to the gum is treated before the tooth is reinserted into the socket and kept stable through the use of splints to adjacent teeth.

=== Aftercare ===
The patient may be given mild pain killers such as paracetamol for the pain. Antibiotics may also be prescribed to prevent infection. The patient should avoid rinsing the mouth, spitting, contact sports, or smoking for the first 24 hours after surgery and should limit food to a soft diet for the next few days. Following surgery, subsequent check ups may be required to evaluate the success of the procedure.

== Complications and risk ==
=== Infection related resorption ===
A leakage of toxins from the infected pulp through dentinal tubules will start a chain reaction that stimulates osteoclasts to resorb, not only from the cementum and dentin, but also alveolar bone. This starts an aggressive resorption process that can lead to loss of most of the root structure in a few months.

=== Tooth discolouration ===
Following any type of trauma to a tooth, there is a possibility for the tooth to discolour. When teeth are damaged or injured in any way, as internal bleeding occurs in the pulp chamber, blood gets into the dentinal nerves and gets trapped into the pulp, staining the dentin. Post trauma, a tooth can discolour and turn black or grey within a few days and if the injury is mild the tooth may return to its original status. However, a severely traumatised tooth may darken gradually with each passing day indicating poor functioning of the dentinal nerves. The tooth ultimately loses its vitality within a few months or a year and will require nerve treatment.

=== Replacement osseous resorption "Ankylosis" ===
Replacement osseous resorption otherwise known as "Ankylosis" of replanted teeth occurs when the root has been stripped of its periodontal membrane, when osteoclasts originating from the surrounding alveolar bone and subsequently osteoblasts, reach the root surface after crossing the damaged periodontal ligament (PDL) and precementum allowing for the joining of the cementum and the bone. Over a number of years, the adjacent bony socket will remodel the tooth, replacing the root with bone, leaving the tooth with no root. Once the root is replaced the visible part of the tooth, the crown, will eventually give way and be lost.

== Contraindications ==
=== Primary teeth ===
The replantation of primary teeth is uniformly cautioned against as primary teeth are in young patients whose facial development is usually incomplete and do not usually have long enough roots for successful replantation. Due to the risks and poor prognosis replanting a primary tooth is cautioned also due to the possible harms it may pose on future permanent teeth.

=== Storage medium ===
To delay and minimise the death of tooth root cells the avulsed tooth must be stored in a suitable medium. Storage in improper mediums can cause further damage to the cells in the tooth, thereby decreasing the chance of successful replantations and increasing potential risks. When considering potential suitable mediums, factors such as fluid pressure and osmolarity need to be taken into account to maintain normal cell metabolism for extended periods of time. Some suitable storage mediums that suit these criteria include Hank's Balanced Salt Solution and whole milk.

=== Time frame ===
Delayed replantation has a poor long term prognosis due to the death of the periodontal ligament, increasing the likelihood of complications such as ankylosis, infection and pulp necrosis. Avulsed teeth should be replanted within the hour to increase the likelihood of a successful tooth replantation.

=== Cell damage ===
Damage to the cells must be minimised during the handling and transportation of the avulsed tooth. Contact should be avoided with the root of the teeth and attempts to cleaning through the use of either soaps, chemicals or toothpaste must not occur. Too much damage occur to the periodontal membrane or fibrolasts, tooth reimplantation may become unviable due to the complications that it presents due to ankylosis and root resorption.
