= Excavate =

Excavate may refer to:

- Excavate or Excavata, a group of organisms
- Excavate, to perform an excavation (archaeology)

== See also ==
- Excavation (disambiguation)
- Digging
