= Mediastinoscope =

Medical instrument

A mediastinoscope is a thin, tube-like instrument used to examine the tissues and lymph nodes in the area between the lungs (mediastinum) in a procedure known as mediastinoscopy. These tissues include the heart and its large blood vessels, trachea, esophagus, and bronchi. The mediastinoscope has a light and a lens for viewing and may also have a tool to remove tissue. It is inserted into the chest through a cut above the breastbone.
