= Puestow procedure =

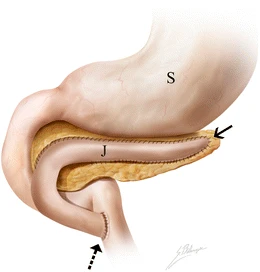
- A Roux-en-Y loop of jejunum is anastomosed to the pancreas with direct drainage of the pancreatic ducts into the jejunum. Black arrow lateral side-to-side pancreaticojejunostomy, dashed arrow jejunojejunostomy, S stomach, J jejunum.
- Specialty: Gastroenterology
- ICD-10-PCS: 48548
- ICD-9-CM: 52.96
- MeSH: D010193

The Puestow procedure (also known as a Puestow-Gillesby procedure, or a lateral/longitudinal pancreaticojejunostomy) is a surgical technique used in the treatment of chronic pancreatitis. It involves a side-to-side anastomosis of the pancreatic duct and the jejunum.

== Technique ==
The operation involves creating a longitudinal incision along the pancreas while the main pancreatic duct is filleted open longitudinally from the head of the organ to its tail. The duct and pancreas are then attached to a loop of the small intestine (pancreaticojejunostomy), which is oversewn to the exposed pancreatic duct in order to allow its drainage. When used in the appropriate setting, pain from chronic pancreatitis can improve. One advantage of this procedure compared to a Frey's procedure is that pancreatic tissue is preserved, which may be of critical importance in patients with exocrine or endocrine insufficiency from their chronic pancreatitis.

== Indications ==
A Puestow procedure is indicated for the treatment of symptomatic chronic pancreatitis patients with pancreatic ductal obstruction and a dilated main pancreatic duct. The main pancreatic duct needs to be 6mm in diameter in the body of the pancreas for this procedure to be possible.

== Limitations ==
One of the problems that can lead to failure of the Puestow procedure is that pain can persist due to failure to drain the pancreatic duct on the head of the pancreas. A Frey's procedure is an alternative surgical procedure to the Puestow that allows for better drainage of the head, but pancreatic tissue is removed.

== Eponym ==
It is named for the American surgeon Charles Puestow (1902–1973).
