= Ossicular replacement prosthesis =

In medicine, an ossicular replacement prosthesis is a device intended to be implanted for the functional reconstruction of segments of the ossicles and facilitates the conduction of sound waves from the tympanic membrane to the inner ear. There are two common types of ossicular replacement prostheses, the total ossicular replacement prosthesis (TORP) and partial ossicular replacement prosthesis (PORP). A TORP replaces the entire ossicular chain while a PORP replaces only the incus and malleus but not the stapes. Indications for use of an ossicular replacement prosthesis include:

- Chronic middle ear disease
- Otosclerosis
- Congenital fixation of the stapes
- Secondary surgical intervention to correct for a significant and persistent conductive hearing loss from prior otologic surgery
- Surgically correctable injury to the middle ear from trauma
