= Retropubic space =

Space in the human abdomen

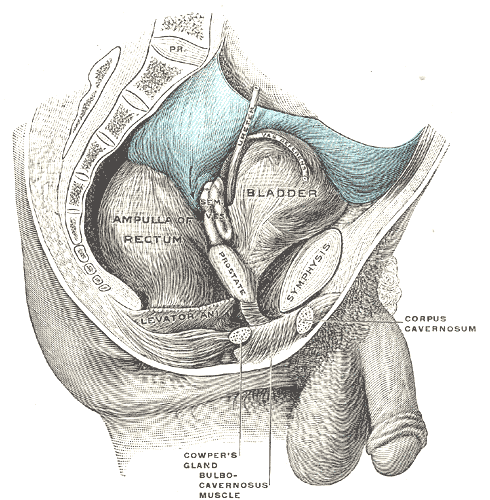
- Male pelvic organs seen from right side. (Retropubic space visible but not labeled.)

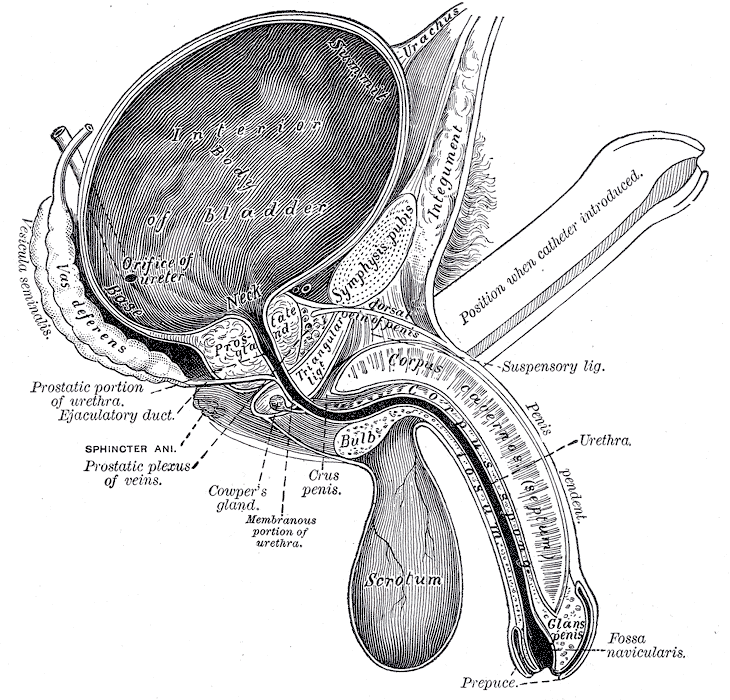
- Vertical section of bladder, penis, and urethra. (Retropubic space visible but not labeled.)

Details
- Location: Pelvis, between the pubic symphysis and the urinary bladder
- Function: Anatomical space

Identifiers
- Latin: spatium retropubicum
- TA98: A10.1.01.003
- TA2: 3822
- FMA: 22060

Retropubic space is a potential avascular space located between the pubic symphysis and the urinary bladder. The retropubic space is a preperitoneal space, located behind the transversalis fascia and in front of peritoneum.

Other names for the retropubic space are "Cave of Retzius" or "Retzius' space", named after the Swedish anatomist Anders Retzius (1796-1860).

The space is a useful landmark in different gynecological and urological surgeries.

== Structure ==
The space is located in the pelvic region and is bounded by the following structures:

- Anteriorly: Symphysis pubis
- Laterally: Pubic rami and obturator internus muscles
- Posteriorly: Urinary bladder
- Floor: Anterior vagina (in women) and proximal urethra

== Function ==
The retropubic space is a potential space.

=== Compartmental pressure ===
The retropubic space is directly adjacent to the abdominal cavity and is hence affected with change in intra-abdominal pressure, which in turn affects the physiology of urination and continence. Normally, intra-abdominal pressure is between 5 and 7 mmHg, and can reach 10 to 15 mmHg chronically in certain cases, such as in pregnant or obese patients. The pressure is strongly related to body mass index and a history of previous surgical procedures. This highly elevated pressure in obese and pregnant patients is sometimes referred to as chronic intra-abdominal hypertension. This pressure is relayed to the adjacent retropubic compartment and can affect the structures within.

== Clinical significance ==
The retropubic space is a surgical landmark that has surgical significance in several gynecological and urological procedures. Access to the space is achieved by separating the rectus abdominis muscle at the mid line, and bluntly dissecting the tissue in the direction of the symphysis pubis, until reaching the peritoneum.

Examples of surgeries involving the retropubic space include:

- The sling procedure. Slings are or considered the first line surgical treatment for women with stress incontinence
- Artificial urinary sphincters are considered first line surgical treatment for certain types of incontinence in men
- Burch colposuspension is a retropubic procedure used in treatment of urinary incontinence in women

== See also ==
- Urinary incontinence
- Striae of Retzius
- Urachus
- Rectovesical pouch
- Vesicouterine pouch
- Rectouterine pouch (Pouch of Douglas)
