= Vesicouterine pouch =

Fold of peritoneum in human female anatomy

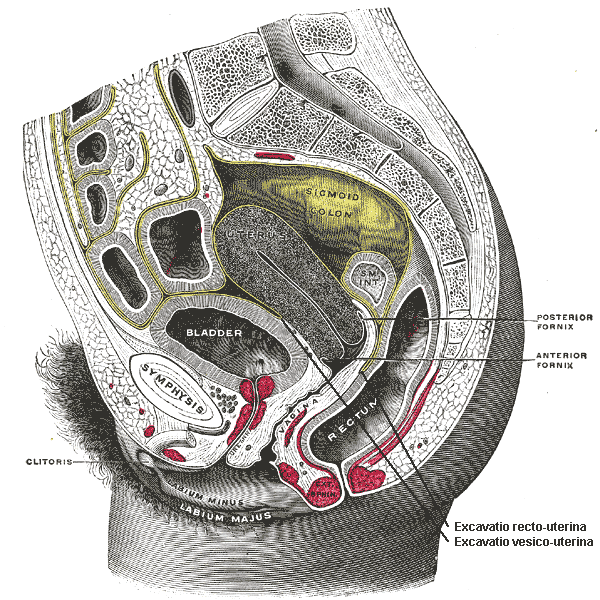
- Sagittal section of the lower part of a female trunk, right segment. (Excavatio vesicouterina labeled at bottom right.)

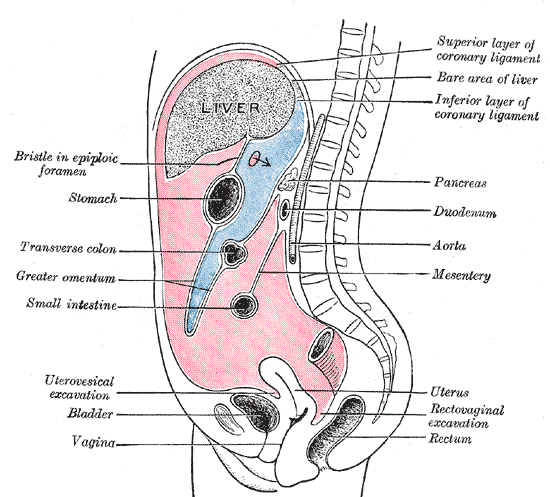
- The epiploic foramen, greater sac or general cavity (red) and lesser sac, or omental bursa (blue). Uterovesical excavation labeled at bottom left, third from the bottom.

Details

Identifiers
- Latin: excavatio vesicouterina
- TA98: A10.1.02.504F
- TA2: 3724
- FMA: 14729

In human female anatomy, the vesicouterine pouch, also uterovesicle pouch, is a fold of peritoneum over the uterus and the bladder. Like the rectouterine pouch, it is a female pelvic recess, but shallower and closer to the anterior fornix of the vagina.

== Structure ==
The vesicouterine pouch is a fold of peritoneum over the uterus and the bladder, forming a pelvic recess. It is continued over the intestinal surface and body of the uterus onto its vesical surface, which it covers as far as the junction of the body and cervix uteri, and then to the bladder. It is narrowest when the uterus is anteverted rather than retroverted. The deepest point of the vesicouterine pouch is typically higher than the deepest point of the rectouterine pouch.

=== Variation ===
When the uterus is very anteverted, the vesicouterine pouch is deeper than usual.

== Clinical significance ==
The vesicouterine pouch may become attached to the uterus, preventing sliding of the bladder past the uterus. This may occur in a third of women who have had a caesarean section, and in some cases of endometriosis.

The vesicouterine pouch is an important anatomical landmark for chronic endometriosis. Endometrial seeding in this region causes cyclical pain in women of child-bearing age. This pouch is also an important factor in a retroverted uterus, which can frequently complicate pregnancies.

== History ==
=== Etymology ===
The vesicouterine (or vesico-uterine) pouch is also called the vesicouterine (or vesico-uterine) excavation, uterovesical (or utero-vesical) pouch, or excavatio vesicouterina. The combining forms reflect the bladder (vesico-, -vesical) and uterus (utero-, -uterine).

== Additional images ==
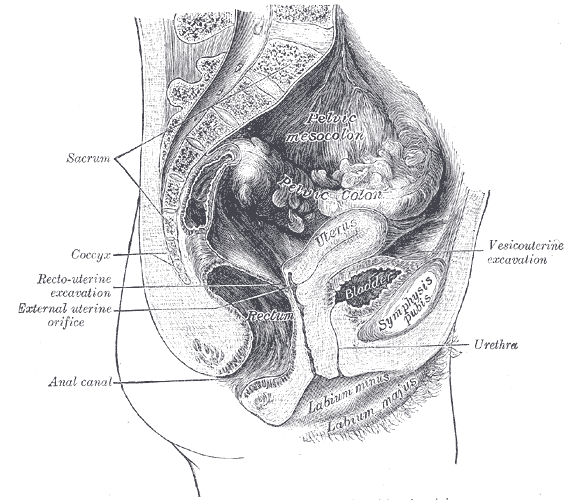
Median sagittal section of female pelvis

== See also ==
- Rectouterine pouch (pouch of Douglas)
- Rectovesical pouch
- Retropubic space
