= Rectovesical pouch =

Part of pelvic anatomy in male mammals

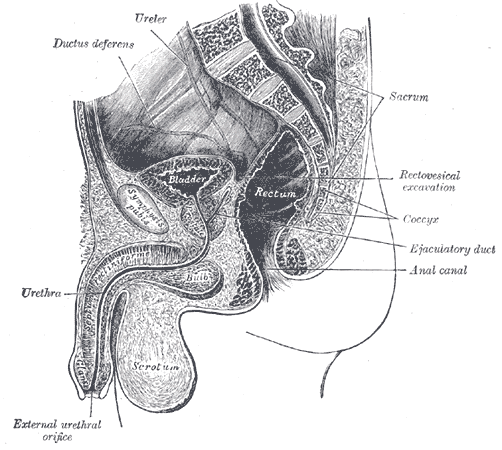
- Median sagittal section of male pelvis. (Rectovesical excavation labeled at center right.)

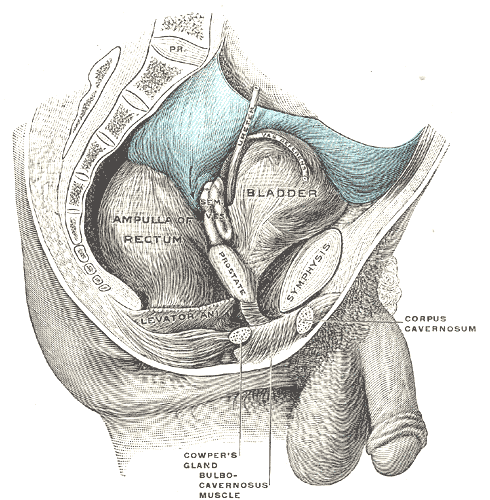
- Male pelvic organs seen from right side. Bladder and rectum distended; relations of peritoneum to the bladder and rectum shown in blue. The arrow points to the rectovesical pouch.

Details

Identifiers
- Latin: excavatio rectovesicalis
- TA98: A10.1.02.513M
- TA2: 3727
- FMA: 14727

The rectovesical pouch is the pocket that lies between the rectum and the bladder in males in humans and other mammals. It is lined by peritoneum.

== Structure ==
The rectovesical pouch is a space between the rectum and the bladder in men. It lies above the seminal vesicles. It is lined by peritoneum and at its base is the rectoprostatic fascia (Denonvillier's fascia). When a man is upright or supine, it is the lowest part of his peritoneal cavity. It may contain parts of the ileum (lower small intestine) and the sigmoid colon.

In women, the uterus lies between the rectum and the bladder. Therefore, women do not have a rectovesical pouch, but instead have a rectouterine pouch and vesicouterine pouch. After a hysterectomy in women, the remaining peritoneum may be referred to as a rectovesical pouch.

== Clinical significance ==
When a man is upright or supine, the rectovesical pouch is the lowest part of his peritoneal cavity. Because of this, peritoneal fluid and other fluids that enter the peritoneal cavity, including ascites, blood and pus, tend to collect in this pouch.

== Additional images ==
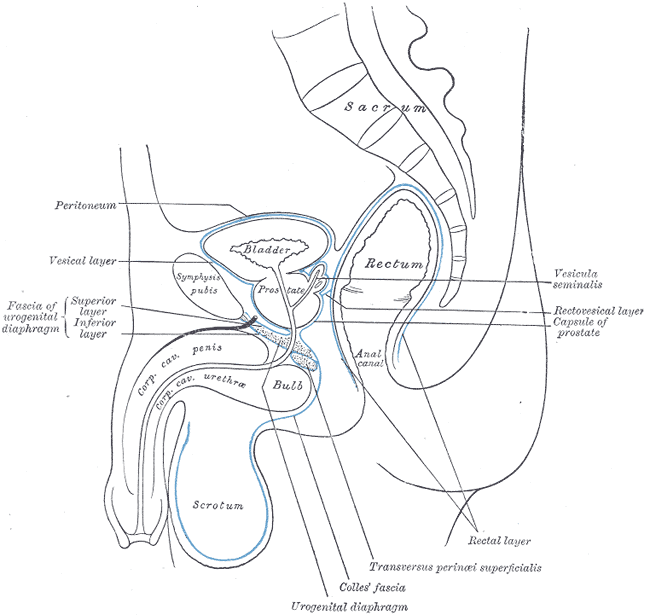
Median sagittal section of pelvis, showing arrangement of fasciae

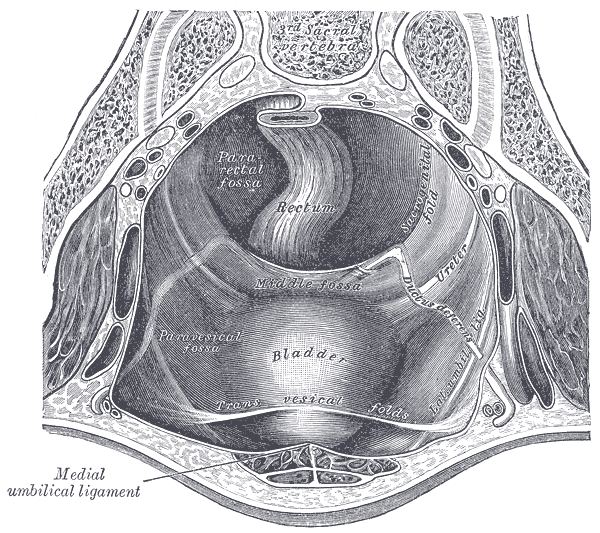
The peritoneum of the male pelvis

== See also ==
- Vesicouterine pouch
- Rectouterine pouch (Pouch of Douglas)
- Retropubic space
