= Rectouterine pouch =

Human female anatomical structure

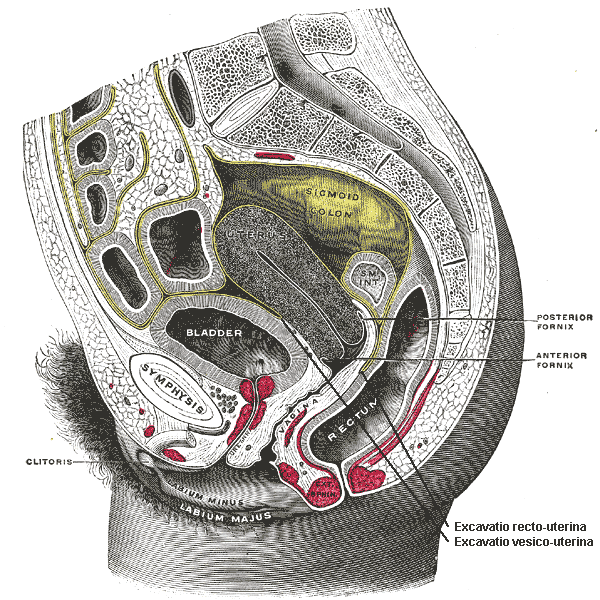
- Sagittal section of the lower part of a female trunk, right segment. (Excavatio recto-uterina labeled at bottom right.)

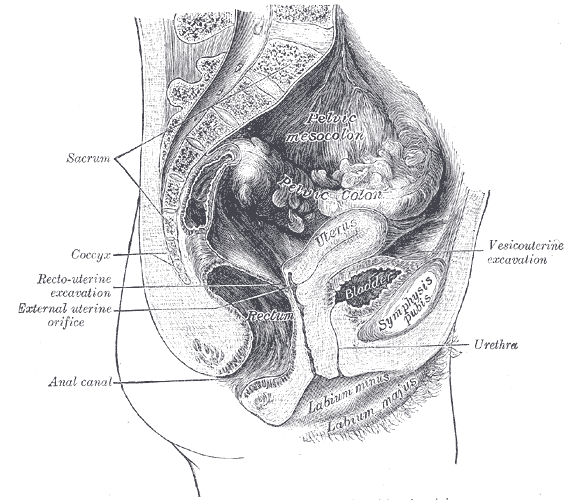
- Median sagittal section of female pelvis. (Rectouterine excavation labeled at center left.)

Details

Identifiers
- Latin: excavatio rectouterina, cavum douglassi, fossa douglasi
- MeSH: D004312
- TA98: A10.1.02.512F
- TA2: 3726
- FMA: 14728

The rectouterine pouch (rectovaginal pouch, cul-de-sac, or formerly pouch of Douglas) is the extension of the peritoneum into the space between the posterior wall of the uterus and the rectum in the human female.

== Structure ==
In women, the rectouterine pouch is the deepest point of the peritoneal cavity. It is posterior to the uterus, and anterior to the rectum. Its anterior boundary is formed by the posterior fornix of the vagina. The pouch on the other side of the uterus near to the anterior fornix is the vesicouterine pouch.

After passing over the fundus of the uterus, the peritoneum extends inferiorly along the entire posterior aspect of the uterus, reaching the posterior vaginal wall before reflecting superior-ward onto the anterior aspect of the rectal ampulla (i.e. the inferior portion of the rectum).

In men, the region corresponding to the rectouterine pouch is the rectovesical pouch, which lies between the urinary bladder and rectum.

=== Peritoneal fluid ===
It is normal to have approximately 1 to 3 ml (or mL) of fluid in the rectouterine pouch throughout the menstrual cycle. After ovulation there is between 4 and 5 ml of fluid in the rectouterine pouch.

== Clinical significance ==
The rectouterine pouch, being the lowest part of the peritoneal cavity in a woman at supine position, is a common site for the spread of pathology such as ascites, tumour, endometriosis, pus, etc.

As it is the furthest point of the abdominopelvic cavity in women, it is a site where infection and fluids typically collect.

The rectouterine pouch can be used in the treatment of end-stage kidney failure in patients who are treated by peritoneal dialysis. The tip of the dialysis catheter is placed into the deepest point of the pouch.

=== Culdocentesis ===
Culdocentesis is a procedure that draws fluid from the pouch, by way of the vagina using a needle. Fluid drawn using a scalpel incision is called a colpotomy.

== Naming and etymology ==
The rectouterine (or recto-uterine) pouch is also called the rectouterine excavation, uterorectal pouch, rectovaginal pouch. The combining forms reflect the rectum (recto-, -rectal) and uterus (utero-, -uterine).

In Obstetrics and gynaecology, it is commonly referred to as the posterior cul-de-sac.

It is sometimes called the pouch of Douglas (after anatomist James Douglas, 1675–1742), Douglas pouch, Douglas cavity, Douglas space, Douglas cul-de-sac, Ehrhardt–Cole recess, Ehrhardt–Cole cul-de-sac, cavum Douglasi, or excavatio rectouterina. The Douglas fold (rectouterine plica), Douglas line, and Douglas septum were likewise named after the same James Douglas.

However, critics point out this name carries a misogynist history, and current medical literature discourages eponymous names.

== In popular culture ==
It was featured in the Netflix special Hannah Gadsby: Douglas to deconstruct patriarchy.

In Ghost World, the trivia question at the cafe where Scarlett Johansson's character works is "where in the human body is the Douglas Pouch located?"

== Additional images ==
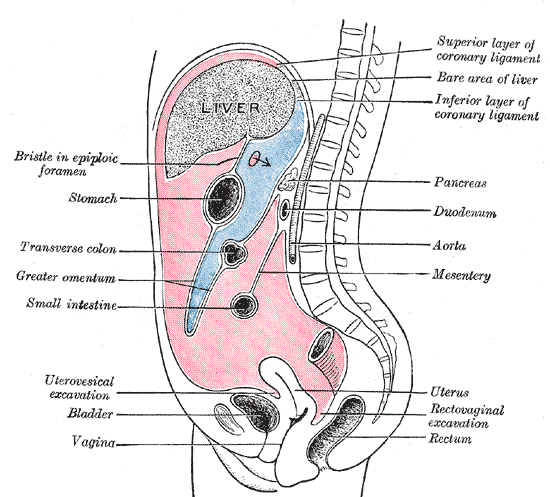
The epiploic foramen, greater sac or general cavity (red) and lesser sac, or omental bursa (blue).

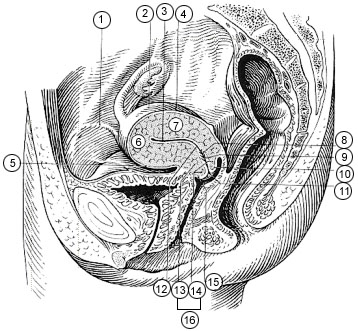
Illu female pelvis

== See also ==
- Vesicouterine pouch
- Rectovesical pouch
- Retropubic space
