= List of MeSH codes (E05) =

The following is a partial list of the "E" codes for Medical Subject Headings (MeSH), as defined by the United States National Library of Medicine (NLM).

This list continues the information at the List of MeSH codes (E04). Codes following these are found in the List of MeSH codes (E06). For other MeSH codes, see List of MeSH codes.

The source for this content is the set of 2006 MeSH Trees from the NLM.

== MeSH E05 – investigative techniques ==
=== MeSH E05.118 – body weights and measures ===
==== MeSH E05.118.160 – body size ====
- MeSH E05.118.160.500 – body height
- MeSH E05.118.160.750 – body weight
- MeSH E05.118.160.750.149 – birth weight
- MeSH E05.118.160.750.300 – fetal weight

=== MeSH E05.181 – centrifugation ===
==== MeSH E05.181.724 – ultracentrifugation ====
- MeSH E05.181.724.336 – centrifugation, density gradient
- MeSH E05.181.724.336.253 – centrifugation, isopycnic
- MeSH E05.181.724.336.336 – centrifugation, zonal

=== MeSH E05.196 – chemistry, analytical ===
==== MeSH E05.196.039 – activation analysis ====
- MeSH E05.196.039.564 – neutron activation analysis

==== MeSH E05.196.131 – calorimetry ====
- MeSH E05.196.131.310 – calorimetry, differential scanning

==== MeSH E05.196.155 – chemical fractionation ====
- MeSH E05.196.155.500 – fractionation, field flow

==== MeSH E05.196.181 – chromatography ====
- MeSH E05.196.181.349 – chromatography, gas
- MeSH E05.196.181.349.390 – flame ionization
- MeSH E05.196.181.349.500 – mass fragmentography
- MeSH E05.196.181.400 – chromatography, liquid
- MeSH E05.196.181.400.170 – chromatography, affinity
- MeSH E05.196.181.400.250 – chromatography, gel
- MeSH E05.196.181.400.250.200 – chromatography, agarose
- MeSH E05.196.181.400.300 – chromatography, high pressure liquid
- MeSH E05.196.181.400.383 – chromatography, ion exchange
- MeSH E05.196.181.400.383.349 – chromatography, deae-cellulose
- MeSH E05.196.181.400.454 – chromatography, paper
- MeSH E05.196.181.400.454.655 – nucleotide mapping
- MeSH E05.196.181.400.454.655.100 – blotting, northern
- MeSH E05.196.181.400.454.655.150 – blotting, southern
- MeSH E05.196.181.400.454.720 – peptide mapping
- MeSH E05.196.181.400.537 – chromatography, thin layer
- MeSH E05.196.181.400.555 – countercurrent distribution
- MeSH E05.196.181.500 – chromatography, micellar electrokinetic capillary
- MeSH E05.196.181.750 – chromatography, supercritical fluid

==== MeSH E05.196.309 – crystallography ====
- MeSH E05.196.309.555 – neutron diffraction
- MeSH E05.196.309.711 – powder diffraction
- MeSH E05.196.309.742 – x-ray diffraction
- MeSH E05.196.309.742.225 – crystallography, x-ray

==== MeSH E05.196.353 – dialysis ====
- MeSH E05.196.353.500 – microdialysis

==== MeSH E05.196.370 – differential thermal analysis ====
- MeSH E05.196.370.310 – calorimetry, differential scanning

==== MeSH E05.196.401 – electrophoresis ====
- MeSH E05.196.401.153 – electrophoresis, agar gel
- MeSH E05.196.401.153.150 – comet assay
- MeSH E05.196.401.190 – electrophoresis, capillary
- MeSH E05.196.401.190.500 – electrophoresis, microchip
- MeSH E05.196.401.200 – electrophoresis, cellulose acetate
- MeSH E05.196.401.220 – electrophoresis, gel, pulsed-field
- MeSH E05.196.401.250 – electrophoresis, gel, two-dimensional
- MeSH E05.196.401.319 – electrophoresis, paper
- MeSH E05.196.401.319.670 – nucleotide mapping
- MeSH E05.196.401.319.670.100 – blotting, northern
- MeSH E05.196.401.319.670.150 – blotting, southern
- MeSH E05.196.401.319.720 – peptide mapping
- MeSH E05.196.401.402 – electrophoresis, polyacrylamide gel
- MeSH E05.196.401.402.236 – electrophoresis, disc
- MeSH E05.196.401.402.250 – electrophoresis, gel, two-dimensional
- MeSH E05.196.401.485 – electrophoresis, starch gel
- MeSH E05.196.401.500 – electrophoretic mobility shift assay
- MeSH E05.196.401.568 – immunoelectrophoresis
- MeSH E05.196.401.568.250 – counterimmunoelectrophoresis
- MeSH E05.196.401.568.520 – immunoelectrophoresis, two-dimensional
- MeSH E05.196.401.663 – isoelectric focusing

==== MeSH E05.196.454 – filtration ====
- MeSH E05.196.454.807 – ultrafiltration
- MeSH E05.196.454.807.300 – hemofiltration
- MeSH E05.196.454.807.300.300 – hemodiafiltration

==== MeSH E05.196.630 – microchip analytical procedures ====
- MeSH E05.196.630.465 – microfluidic analytical techniques
- MeSH E05.196.630.465.340 – electrophoresis, microchip
- MeSH E05.196.630.570 – microarray analysis
- MeSH E05.196.630.570.660 – oligonucleotide array sequence analysis
- MeSH E05.196.630.570.700 – protein array analysis
- MeSH E05.196.630.570.850 – tissue array analysis

==== MeSH E05.196.680 – nucleotide mapping ====
- MeSH E05.196.680.100 – blotting, northern
- MeSH E05.196.680.150 – blotting, southern

==== MeSH E05.196.700 – peptide mapping ====
- MeSH E05.196.700.690 – protein footprinting

==== MeSH E05.196.712 – photometry ====
- MeSH E05.196.712.224 – densitometry
- MeSH E05.196.712.224.187 – absorptiometry, photon
- MeSH E05.196.712.224.375 – densitometry, x-ray
- MeSH E05.196.712.516 – luminescent measurements
- MeSH E05.196.712.516.200 – chemiluminescent measurements
- MeSH E05.196.712.516.600 – fluorometry
- MeSH E05.196.712.516.600.240 – cytophotometry
- MeSH E05.196.712.516.600.240.350 – flow cytometry
- MeSH E05.196.712.516.600.240.400 – image cytometry
- MeSH E05.196.712.516.600.240.400.500 – laser scanning cytometry
- MeSH E05.196.712.516.600.390 – fluorescence polarization
- MeSH E05.196.712.516.600.390.350 – fluorescence polarization immunoassay
- MeSH E05.196.712.516.600.393 – fluorescence recovery after photobleaching
- MeSH E05.196.712.516.600.410 – fluorophotometry
- MeSH E05.196.712.516.600.676 – spectrometry, fluorescence
- MeSH E05.196.712.516.600.676.500 – fluorescence resonance energy transfer
- MeSH E05.196.712.650 – nephelometry and turbidimetry
- MeSH E05.196.712.726 – spectrophotometry
- MeSH E05.196.712.726.300 – microspectrophotometry
- MeSH E05.196.712.726.551 – spectrophotometry, atomic
- MeSH E05.196.712.726.676 – spectrophotometry, infrared
- MeSH E05.196.712.726.676.700 – spectroscopy, fourier transform infrared
- MeSH E05.196.712.726.802 – spectrophotometry, ultraviolet

==== MeSH E05.196.867 – spectrum analysis ====
- MeSH E05.196.867.151 – circular dichroism
- MeSH E05.196.867.519 – magnetic resonance spectroscopy
- MeSH E05.196.867.519.274 – electron spin resonance spectroscopy
- MeSH E05.196.867.519.550 – nuclear magnetic resonance, biomolecular
- MeSH E05.196.867.576 – optical rotatory dispersion
- MeSH E05.196.867.660 – pulse radiolysis
- MeSH E05.196.867.726 – spectrometry, fluorescence
- MeSH E05.196.867.776 – spectrometry, gamma
- MeSH E05.196.867.776.751 – spectroscopy, mossbauer
- MeSH E05.196.867.800 – spectrometry, x-ray emission
- MeSH E05.196.867.800.360 – electron probe microanalysis
- MeSH E05.196.867.826 – spectrophotometry
- MeSH E05.196.867.826.300 – microspectrophotometry
- MeSH E05.196.867.826.551 – spectrophotometry, atomic
- MeSH E05.196.867.826.676 – spectrophotometry, infrared
- MeSH E05.196.867.826.676.700 – spectroscopy, fourier transform infrared
- MeSH E05.196.867.826.802 – spectrophotometry, ultraviolet
- MeSH E05.196.867.838 – spectroscopy, electron energy-loss
- MeSH E05.196.867.838.500 – microscopy, energy-filtering transmission electron
- MeSH E05.196.867.851 – spectroscopy, near-infrared
- MeSH E05.196.867.877 – spectrum analysis, mass
- MeSH E05.196.867.877.500 – mass fragmentography
- MeSH E05.196.867.877.600 – spectrometry, mass, electrospray ionization
- MeSH E05.196.867.877.750 – spectrometry, mass, fast atom bombardment
- MeSH E05.196.867.877.755 – spectrometry, mass, matrix-assisted laser desorption-ionization
- MeSH E05.196.867.877.760 – spectrometry, mass, secondary ion
- MeSH E05.196.867.890 – spectrum analysis, raman

==== MeSH E05.196.922 – titrimetry ====
- MeSH E05.196.922.250 – colorimetry
- MeSH E05.196.922.375 – complement hemolytic activity assay
- MeSH E05.196.922.500 – conductometry
- MeSH E05.196.922.625 – neutralization tests
- MeSH E05.196.922.750 – potentiometry
- MeSH E05.196.922.875 – skin test end-point titration

==== MeSH E05.196.941 – ultracentrifugation ====
- MeSH E05.196.941.336 – centrifugation, density gradient
- MeSH E05.196.941.336.253 – centrifugation, isopycnic
- MeSH E05.196.941.336.419 – centrifugation, zonal

=== MeSH E05.200 – clinical laboratory techniques ===
==== MeSH E05.200.249 – culture techniques ====
- MeSH E05.200.249.249 – cell culture techniques
- MeSH E05.200.249.374 – coculture techniques
- MeSH E05.200.249.437 – diffusion chambers, culture
- MeSH E05.200.249.468 – embryo culture techniques
- MeSH E05.200.249.484 – organ culture techniques
- MeSH E05.200.249.617 – tissue culture techniques
- MeSH E05.200.249.750 – tissue engineering

==== MeSH E05.200.500 – cytological techniques ====
- MeSH E05.200.500.105 – autoradiography
- MeSH E05.200.500.195 – cell count
- MeSH E05.200.500.195.107 – blood cell count
- MeSH E05.200.500.195.107.330 – erythrocyte count
- MeSH E05.200.500.195.107.330.725 – reticulocyte count
- MeSH E05.200.500.195.107.595 – leukocyte count
- MeSH E05.200.500.195.107.595.500 – lymphocyte count
- MeSH E05.200.500.195.107.595.500.150 – cd4 lymphocyte count
- MeSH E05.200.500.195.107.595.500.150.160 – cd4-cd8 ratio
- MeSH E05.200.500.195.107.740 – platelet count
- MeSH E05.200.500.195.870 – sperm count
- MeSH E05.200.500.251 – cell fractionation
- MeSH E05.200.500.307 – cell fusion
- MeSH E05.200.500.363 – cell separation
- MeSH E05.200.500.363.285 – cytapheresis
- MeSH E05.200.500.363.285.570 – leukapheresis
- MeSH E05.200.500.363.285.790 – plateletpheresis
- MeSH E05.200.500.363.400 – immunomagnetic separation
- MeSH E05.200.500.363.540 – leukocyte reduction procedures
- MeSH E05.200.500.383 – colony-forming units assay
- MeSH E05.200.500.383.910 – tumor stem cell assay
- MeSH E05.200.500.385 – cytogenetic analysis
- MeSH E05.200.500.385.130 – chromosome banding
- MeSH E05.200.500.385.500 – mitotic index
- MeSH E05.200.500.386 – cytophotometry
- MeSH E05.200.500.386.350 – flow cytometry
- MeSH E05.200.500.386.400 – image cytometry
- MeSH E05.200.500.386.400.500 – laser scanning cytometry
- MeSH E05.200.500.387 – diffusion chambers, culture
- MeSH E05.200.500.388 – drug screening assays, antitumor
- MeSH E05.200.500.388.930 – tumor stem cell assay
- MeSH E05.200.500.410 – electroporation
- MeSH E05.200.500.607 – histocytochemistry
- MeSH E05.200.500.607.512 – immunohistochemistry
- MeSH E05.200.500.607.790 – periodic acid-schiff reaction
- MeSH E05.200.500.607.810 – prussian blue reaction
- MeSH E05.200.500.620 – histocytological preparation techniques
- MeSH E05.200.500.620.530 – microtomy
- MeSH E05.200.500.620.530.160 – cryoultramicrotomy
- MeSH E05.200.500.620.530.160.260 – frozen sections
- MeSH E05.200.500.620.620 – replica techniques
- MeSH E05.200.500.620.620.150 – corrosion casting
- MeSH E05.200.500.620.620.260 – freeze fracturing
- MeSH E05.200.500.620.620.260.400 – freeze etching
- MeSH E05.200.500.620.670 – staining and labeling
- MeSH E05.200.500.620.670.130 – chromosome banding
- MeSH E05.200.500.620.670.325 – in situ hybridization
- MeSH E05.200.500.620.670.325.350 – in situ hybridization, fluorescence
- MeSH E05.200.500.620.670.325.350.125 – chromosome painting
- MeSH E05.200.500.620.670.325.680 – primed in situ labeling
- MeSH E05.200.500.620.670.520 – negative staining
- MeSH E05.200.500.620.670.620 – periodic acid-schiff reaction
- MeSH E05.200.500.620.670.660 – prussian blue reaction
- MeSH E05.200.500.620.670.770 – shadowing (histology)
- MeSH E05.200.500.620.670.780 – silver staining
- MeSH E05.200.500.620.720 – tissue embedding
- MeSH E05.200.500.620.720.610 – paraffin embedding
- MeSH E05.200.500.620.720.640 – plastic embedding
- MeSH E05.200.500.620.760 – tissue preservation
- MeSH E05.200.500.620.760.160 – cryopreservation
- MeSH E05.200.500.620.760.160.260 – freeze drying
- MeSH E05.200.500.620.760.160.260.270 – freeze substitution
- MeSH E05.200.500.620.760.720 – tissue fixation
- MeSH E05.200.500.695 – karyometry
- MeSH E05.200.500.800 – patch-clamp techniques

==== MeSH E05.200.750 – histological techniques ====
- MeSH E05.200.750.132 – autoradiography
- MeSH E05.200.750.210 – bone demineralization technique
- MeSH E05.200.750.288 – decalcification technique
- MeSH E05.200.750.551 – histocytochemistry
- MeSH E05.200.750.551.512 – immunohistochemistry
- MeSH E05.200.750.551.512.240 – fluorescent antibody technique
- MeSH E05.200.750.551.512.240.300 – fluorescent antibody technique, direct
- MeSH E05.200.750.551.512.240.310 – fluorescent antibody technique, indirect
- MeSH E05.200.750.551.790 – periodic acid-schiff reaction
- MeSH E05.200.750.551.810 – prussian blue reaction
- MeSH E05.200.750.600 – histocytological preparation techniques
- MeSH E05.200.750.600.520 – microdissection
- MeSH E05.200.750.600.530 – microtomy
- MeSH E05.200.750.600.530.160 – cryoultramicrotomy
- MeSH E05.200.750.600.530.160.260 – frozen sections
- MeSH E05.200.750.600.620 – replica techniques
- MeSH E05.200.750.600.620.150 – corrosion casting
- MeSH E05.200.750.600.620.260 – freeze fracturing
- MeSH E05.200.750.600.620.260.400 – freeze etching
- MeSH E05.200.750.600.670 – staining and labeling
- MeSH E05.200.750.600.670.130 – chromosome banding
- MeSH E05.200.750.600.670.325 – in situ hybridization
- MeSH E05.200.750.600.670.325.350 – in situ hybridization, fluorescence
- MeSH E05.200.750.600.670.325.350.125 – chromosome painting
- MeSH E05.200.750.600.670.325.680 – primed in situ labeling
- MeSH E05.200.750.600.670.520 – negative staining
- MeSH E05.200.750.600.670.620 – periodic acid-schiff reaction
- MeSH E05.200.750.600.670.660 – prussian blue reaction
- MeSH E05.200.750.600.670.770 – shadowing (histology)
- MeSH E05.200.750.600.670.780 – silver staining
- MeSH E05.200.750.600.720 – tissue embedding
- MeSH E05.200.750.600.720.610 – paraffin embedding
- MeSH E05.200.750.600.720.640 – plastic embedding
- MeSH E05.200.750.600.760 – tissue preservation
- MeSH E05.200.750.600.760.160 – cryopreservation
- MeSH E05.200.750.600.760.160.260 – freeze drying
- MeSH E05.200.750.600.760.160.260.270 – freeze substitution
- MeSH E05.200.750.600.760.720 – tissue fixation

==== MeSH E05.200.875 – microbiological techniques ====
- MeSH E05.200.875.150 – bacteriological techniques
- MeSH E05.200.875.150.125 – bacterial typing techniques
- MeSH E05.200.875.150.125.150 – bacteriophage typing
- MeSH E05.200.875.150.125.765 – ribotyping
- MeSH E05.200.875.150.125.890 – serotyping
- MeSH E05.200.875.150.570 – limulus test
- MeSH E05.200.875.220 – colony count, microbial
- MeSH E05.200.875.595 – microbial sensitivity tests
- MeSH E05.200.875.595.800 – serum bactericidal test
- MeSH E05.200.875.610 – mycological typing techniques
- MeSH E05.200.875.837 – serial passage
- MeSH E05.200.875.950 – viral load
- MeSH E05.200.875.970 – virus cultivation
- MeSH E05.200.875.970.790 – plaque assay
- MeSH E05.200.875.977 – virus inactivation
- MeSH E05.200.875.985 – xenodiagnosis

=== MeSH E05.300 – drug administration routes ===
==== MeSH E05.300.100 – administration, oral ====
- MeSH E05.300.100.028 – administration, buccal
- MeSH E05.300.100.878 – administration, sublingual

==== MeSH E05.300.120 – administration, topical ====
- MeSH E05.300.120.040 – administration, buccal
- MeSH E05.300.120.060 – administration, cutaneous
- MeSH E05.300.120.080 – administration, intranasal
- MeSH E05.300.120.500 – administration, intravaginal
- MeSH E05.300.120.505 – administration, intravesical
- MeSH E05.300.120.610 – administration, rectal

==== MeSH E05.300.510 – infusions, parenteral ====
- MeSH E05.300.510.520 – infusions, intra-arterial
- MeSH E05.300.510.555 – infusions, intralesional
- MeSH E05.300.510.560 – infusions, intraosseous
- MeSH E05.300.510.590 – infusions, intravenous

==== MeSH E05.300.530 – injections ====
- MeSH E05.300.530.370 – injections, intra-arterial
- MeSH E05.300.530.380 – injections, intra-articular
- MeSH E05.300.530.430 – injections, intralesional
- MeSH E05.300.530.440 – injections, intralymphatic
- MeSH E05.300.530.460 – injections, intramuscular
- MeSH E05.300.530.490 – injections, intraperitoneal
- MeSH E05.300.530.540 – injections, intravenous
- MeSH E05.300.530.550 – injections, intraventricular
- MeSH E05.300.530.580 – injections, spinal
- MeSH E05.300.530.580.300 – injections, epidural
- MeSH E05.300.530.580.300.145 – blood patch, epidural
- MeSH E05.300.530.620 – injections, subcutaneous
- MeSH E05.300.530.620.410 – injections, intradermal
- MeSH E05.300.530.620.570 – injections, jet
- MeSH E05.300.530.620.570.100 – biolistics
- MeSH E05.300.530.690 – microinjections

=== MeSH E05.318 – epidemiologic methods ===
==== MeSH E05.318.308 – data collection ====
- MeSH E05.318.308.225 – geriatric assessment
- MeSH E05.318.308.250 – health surveys
- MeSH E05.318.308.250.149 – behavioral risk factor surveillance system
- MeSH E05.318.308.250.300 – dental health surveys
- MeSH E05.318.308.250.300.300 – dental plaque index
- MeSH E05.318.308.250.300.350 – dmf index
- MeSH E05.318.308.250.300.675 – oral hygiene index
- MeSH E05.318.308.250.300.725 – periodontal index
- MeSH E05.318.308.250.475 – health status indicators
- MeSH E05.318.308.250.475.365 – apache
- MeSH E05.318.308.250.475.547 – severity of illness index
- MeSH E05.318.308.250.475.547.500 – karnofsky performance status
- MeSH E05.318.308.250.475.730 – sickness impact profile
- MeSH E05.318.308.250.580 – mass screening
- MeSH E05.318.308.250.580.174 – anonymous testing
- MeSH E05.318.308.250.580.350 – genetic screening
- MeSH E05.318.308.250.580.510 – mass chest x-ray
- MeSH E05.318.308.250.580.560 – multiphasic screening
- MeSH E05.318.308.250.580.580 – neonatal screening
- MeSH E05.318.308.250.580.925 – vision screening
- MeSH E05.318.308.250.600 – nutrition surveys
- MeSH E05.318.308.250.600.350 – diet surveys
- MeSH E05.318.308.250.700 – population surveillance
- MeSH E05.318.308.250.700.650 – sentinel surveillance
- MeSH E05.318.308.335 – health care surveys
- MeSH E05.318.308.420 – interviews
- MeSH E05.318.308.420.200 – focus groups
- MeSH E05.318.308.502 – narration
- MeSH E05.318.308.585 – nutrition assessment
- MeSH E05.318.308.585.550 – nutrition surveys
- MeSH E05.318.308.585.550.350 – diet surveys
- MeSH E05.318.308.750 – questionnaires
- MeSH E05.318.308.940 – records
- MeSH E05.318.308.940.250 – birth certificates
- MeSH E05.318.308.940.350 – death certificates
- MeSH E05.318.308.940.375 – dental records
- MeSH E05.318.308.940.425 – hospital records
- MeSH E05.318.308.940.968 – medical records
- MeSH E05.318.308.940.968.500 – medical record linkage
- MeSH E05.318.308.940.968.625 – medical records systems, computerized
- MeSH E05.318.308.940.968.750 – medical records, problem-oriented
- MeSH E05.318.308.940.968.875 – trauma severity indices
- MeSH E05.318.308.940.968.875.125 – abbreviated injury scale
- MeSH E05.318.308.940.968.875.250 – glasgow coma scale
- MeSH E05.318.308.940.968.875.260 – glasgow outcome scale
- MeSH E05.318.308.940.968.875.500 – injury severity score
- MeSH E05.318.308.940.984 – nursing records
- MeSH E05.318.308.970 – registries
- MeSH E05.318.308.970.725 – seer program
- MeSH E05.318.308.985 – vital statistics
- MeSH E05.318.308.985.450 – life expectancy
- MeSH E05.318.308.985.475 – life tables
- MeSH E05.318.308.985.525 – morbidity
- MeSH E05.318.308.985.525.080 – basic reproduction number
- MeSH E05.318.308.985.525.375 – incidence
- MeSH E05.318.308.985.525.750 – prevalence
- MeSH E05.318.308.985.550 – mortality
- MeSH E05.318.308.985.550.250 – cause of death
- MeSH E05.318.308.985.550.287 – child mortality
- MeSH E05.318.308.985.550.325 – fatal outcome
- MeSH E05.318.308.985.550.362 – fetal mortality
- MeSH E05.318.308.985.550.400 – hospital mortality
- MeSH E05.318.308.985.550.475 – infant mortality
- MeSH E05.318.308.985.550.500 – maternal mortality
- MeSH E05.318.308.985.550.900 – survival rate
- MeSH E05.318.308.985.775 – pregnancy rate
- MeSH E05.318.308.985.775.500 – birth rate

==== MeSH E05.318.740 – statistics ====
- MeSH E05.318.740.100 – actuarial analysis
- MeSH E05.318.740.150 – analysis of variance
- MeSH E05.318.740.150.500 – multivariate analysis
- MeSH E05.318.740.200 – area under curve
- MeSH E05.318.740.250 – cluster analysis
- MeSH E05.318.740.250.675 – small-area analysis
- MeSH E05.318.740.250.700 – space-time clustering
- MeSH E05.318.740.275 – confidence intervals
- MeSH E05.318.740.300 – data interpretation, statistical
- MeSH E05.318.740.350 – discriminant analysis
- MeSH E05.318.740.400 – factor analysis, statistical
- MeSH E05.318.740.475 – matched-pair analysis
- MeSH E05.318.740.500 – models, statistical
- MeSH E05.318.740.500.475 – likelihood functions
- MeSH E05.318.740.500.500 – linear models
- MeSH E05.318.740.500.525 – logistic models
- MeSH E05.318.740.500.600 – models, economic
- MeSH E05.318.740.500.600.500 – models, econometric
- MeSH E05.318.740.500.625 – nomograms
- MeSH E05.318.740.500.700 – proportional hazards models
- MeSH E05.318.740.525 – monte carlo method
- MeSH E05.318.740.600 – probability
- MeSH E05.318.740.600.200 – Bayes' theorem
- MeSH E05.318.740.600.400 – likelihood functions
- MeSH E05.318.740.600.500 – markov chains
- MeSH E05.318.740.600.600 – odds ratio
- MeSH E05.318.740.600.700 – proportional hazards models
- MeSH E05.318.740.600.800 – risk
- MeSH E05.318.740.600.800.450 – logistic models
- MeSH E05.318.740.600.800.715 – risk assessment
- MeSH E05.318.740.600.800.725 – risk factors
- MeSH E05.318.740.600.900 – uncertainty
- MeSH E05.318.740.750 – regression analysis
- MeSH E05.318.740.750.400 – least-squares analysis
- MeSH E05.318.740.750.425 – linear models
- MeSH E05.318.740.750.450 – logistic models
- MeSH E05.318.740.750.725 – proportional hazards models
- MeSH E05.318.740.872 – sensitivity and specificity
- MeSH E05.318.740.994 – statistical distributions
- MeSH E05.318.740.994.250 – binomial distribution
- MeSH E05.318.740.994.300 – chi-square distribution
- MeSH E05.318.740.994.500 – normal distribution
- MeSH E05.318.740.994.750 – poisson distribution
- MeSH E05.318.740.995 – statistics, nonparametric
- MeSH E05.318.740.996 – stochastic processes
- MeSH E05.318.740.996.500 – markov chains
- MeSH E05.318.740.998 – survival analysis
- MeSH E05.318.740.998.300 – disease-free survival

==== MeSH E05.318.760 – epidemiologic study characteristics ====
- MeSH E05.318.760.500 – epidemiologic studies
- MeSH E05.318.760.500.500 – case-control studies
- MeSH E05.318.760.500.500.500 – retrospective studies
- MeSH E05.318.760.500.750 – cohort studies
- MeSH E05.318.760.500.750.500 – longitudinal studies
- MeSH E05.318.760.500.750.500.350 – follow-up studies
- MeSH E05.318.760.500.750.500.650 – prospective studies
- MeSH E05.318.760.500.875 – cross-sectional studies
- MeSH E05.318.760.500.950 – seroepidemiologic studies
- MeSH E05.318.760.500.950.375 – hiv seroprevalence
- MeSH E05.318.760.535 – clinical trials
- MeSH E05.318.760.535.200 – clinical trials, phase i
- MeSH E05.318.760.535.210 – clinical trials, phase ii
- MeSH E05.318.760.535.220 – clinical trials, phase iii
- MeSH E05.318.760.535.230 – clinical trials, phase iv
- MeSH E05.318.760.535.365 – controlled clinical trials
- MeSH E05.318.760.535.365.500 – randomized controlled trials
- MeSH E05.318.760.535.500 – multicenter studies
- MeSH E05.318.760.550 – feasibility studies
- MeSH E05.318.760.565 – intervention studies
- MeSH E05.318.760.750 – pilot projects
- MeSH E05.318.760.875 – sampling studies
- MeSH E05.318.760.900 – twin studies

==== MeSH E05.318.780 – epidemiologic research design ====
- MeSH E05.318.780.074 – control groups
- MeSH E05.318.780.150 – cross-over studies
- MeSH E05.318.780.300 – double-blind method
- MeSH E05.318.780.485 – matched-pair analysis
- MeSH E05.318.780.500 – meta-analysis
- MeSH E05.318.780.700 – random allocation
- MeSH E05.318.780.725 – reproducibility of results
- MeSH E05.318.780.762 – sample size
- MeSH E05.318.780.800 – sensitivity and specificity
- MeSH E05.318.780.800.650 – predictive value of tests
- MeSH E05.318.780.800.750 – roc curve
- MeSH E05.318.780.850 – single-blind method

=== MeSH E05.320 – equipment design ===
==== MeSH E05.320.550 – prosthesis design ====
- MeSH E05.320.550.550 – prosthesis coloring

=== MeSH E05.337 – evaluation studies ===
==== MeSH E05.337.250 – clinical trials ====
- MeSH E05.337.250.200 – clinical trials, phase i
- MeSH E05.337.250.210 – clinical trials, phase ii
- MeSH E05.337.250.220 – clinical trials, phase iii
- MeSH E05.337.250.230 – clinical trials, phase iv
- MeSH E05.337.250.365 – controlled clinical trials
- MeSH E05.337.250.365.500 – randomized controlled trials
- MeSH E05.337.250.500 – multicenter studies

==== MeSH E05.337.300 – drug approval ====
- MeSH E05.337.300.400 – investigational new drug application

==== MeSH E05.337.550 – drug evaluation, preclinical ====
- MeSH E05.337.550.200 – drug screening assays, antitumor
- MeSH E05.337.550.200.800 – tumor stem cell assay
- MeSH E05.337.550.200.900 – xenograft model antitumor assays
- MeSH E05.337.550.200.900.830 – subrenal capsule assay
- MeSH E05.337.550.400 – microbial sensitivity tests
- MeSH E05.337.550.400.800 – serum bactericidal test
- MeSH E05.337.550.600 – parasitic sensitivity tests

==== MeSH E05.337.800 – product surveillance, postmarketing ====
- MeSH E05.337.800.120 – adverse drug reaction reporting systems
- MeSH E05.337.800.200 – clinical trials, phase iv

=== MeSH E05.393 – genetic techniques ===
==== MeSH E05.393.183 – chromosome mapping ====
- MeSH E05.393.183.250 – chromosome walking
- MeSH E05.393.183.620 – physical chromosome mapping
- MeSH E05.393.183.620.160 – contig mapping
- MeSH E05.393.183.620.405 – radiation hybrid mapping
- MeSH E05.393.183.620.650 – restriction mapping

==== MeSH E05.393.220 – cloning, molecular ====
- MeSH E05.393.220.250 – artificial gene fusion
- MeSH E05.393.220.870 – two-hybrid system techniques

==== MeSH E05.393.281 – crosses, genetic ====
- MeSH E05.393.281.526 – genetic complementation test

==== MeSH E05.393.285 – cytogenetic analysis ====
- MeSH E05.393.285.130 – chromosome banding
- MeSH E05.393.285.350 – in situ hybridization, fluorescence
- MeSH E05.393.285.350.125 – chromosome painting
- MeSH E05.393.285.350.125.800 – spectral karyotyping
- MeSH E05.393.285.475 – karyotyping
- MeSH E05.393.285.475.800 – spectral karyotyping
- MeSH E05.393.285.830 – sex determination (analysis)

==== MeSH E05.393.290 – dna fingerprinting ====
- MeSH E05.393.290.765 – ribotyping

==== MeSH E05.393.350 – gene transfer techniques ====
- MeSH E05.393.350.100 – biolistics
- MeSH E05.393.350.800 – transduction, genetic
- MeSH E05.393.350.810 – transfection
- MeSH E05.393.350.810.500 – transformation, bacterial

==== MeSH E05.393.420 – genetic engineering ====
- MeSH E05.393.420.175 – directed molecular evolution
- MeSH E05.393.420.238 – dna shuffling
- MeSH E05.393.420.301 – gene therapy
- MeSH E05.393.420.451 – genetic enhancement
- MeSH E05.393.420.601 – protein engineering
- MeSH E05.393.420.601.035 – amino acid substitution
- MeSH E05.393.420.601.550 – mutagenesis, insertional
- MeSH E05.393.420.601.575 – mutagenesis, site-directed
- MeSH E05.393.420.890 – sex preselection

==== MeSH E05.393.525 – molecular probe techniques ====
- MeSH E05.393.525.085 – biotinylation
- MeSH E05.393.525.100 – blotting, northern
- MeSH E05.393.525.150 – blotting, southern
- MeSH E05.393.525.225 – blotting, southwestern
- MeSH E05.393.525.300 – branched dna signal amplification assay
- MeSH E05.393.525.640 – oligonucleotide array sequence analysis
- MeSH E05.393.525.680 – protein array analysis
- MeSH E05.393.525.700 – random amplified polymorphic dna technique
- MeSH E05.393.525.870 – two-hybrid system techniques

==== MeSH E05.393.560 – mutagenicity tests ====
- MeSH E05.393.560.150 – comet assay
- MeSH E05.393.560.598 – micronucleus tests

==== MeSH E05.393.600 – Nuclease protection assaysfpatch ====
- MeSH E05.393.600.300 – dna footprinting

==== MeSH E05.393.620 – nucleic acid amplification techniques ====
- MeSH E05.393.620.311 – ligase chain reaction
- MeSH E05.393.620.374 – self-sustained sequence replication
- MeSH E05.393.620.500 – polymerase chain reaction
- MeSH E05.393.620.500.650 – primed in situ labeling
- MeSH E05.393.620.500.687 – random amplified polymorphic dna technique
- MeSH E05.393.620.500.725 – Reverse transcription polymerase chain reaction

==== MeSH E05.393.661 – nucleic acid hybridization ====
- MeSH E05.393.661.124 – branched dna signal amplification assay
- MeSH E05.393.661.250 – heteroduplex analysis
- MeSH E05.393.661.475 – in situ hybridization
- MeSH E05.393.661.475.350 – in situ hybridization, fluorescence
- MeSH E05.393.661.475.350.125 – chromosome painting
- MeSH E05.393.661.475.680 – primed in situ labeling
- MeSH E05.393.661.640 – oligonucleotide array sequence analysis

==== MeSH E05.393.760 – sequence analysis ====
- MeSH E05.393.760.640 – oligonucleotide array sequence analysis
- MeSH E05.393.760.700 – sequence analysis, dna
- MeSH E05.393.760.700.300 – dna mutational analysis
- MeSH E05.393.760.705 – sequence analysis, protein
- MeSH E05.393.760.705.685 – peptide mapping
- MeSH E05.393.760.705.685.690 – protein footprinting
- MeSH E05.393.760.710 – sequence analysis, rna

=== MeSH E05.472 – immobilization ===
==== MeSH E05.472.760 – restraint, physical ====
- MeSH E05.472.760.370 – hindlimb suspension

=== MeSH E05.478 – immunologic techniques ===
==== MeSH E05.478.245 – cytotoxicity tests, immunologic ====
- MeSH E05.478.245.150 – complement hemolytic activity assay

==== MeSH E05.478.468 – histocompatibility testing ====
- MeSH E05.478.468.429 – lymphocyte culture test, mixed

==== MeSH E05.478.550 – immunization ====
- MeSH E05.478.550.520 – immunization, passive
- MeSH E05.478.550.520.050 – adoptive transfer
- MeSH E05.478.550.520.050.400 – immunotherapy, adoptive
- MeSH E05.478.550.545 – immunization schedule
- MeSH E05.478.550.550 – immunization, secondary
- MeSH E05.478.550.600 – immunotherapy, active
- MeSH E05.478.550.600.890 – vaccination
- MeSH E05.478.550.650 – mass immunization

==== MeSH E05.478.567 – immunoassay ====
- MeSH E05.478.567.320 – immunoblotting
- MeSH E05.478.567.320.200 – blotting, western
- MeSH E05.478.567.320.200.200 – blotting, far-western
- MeSH E05.478.567.350 – immunoenzyme techniques
- MeSH E05.478.567.350.170 – enzyme-linked immunosorbent assay
- MeSH E05.478.567.350.180 – enzyme multiplied immunoassay technique
- MeSH E05.478.567.380 – immunosorbent techniques
- MeSH E05.478.567.380.360 – enzyme-linked immunosorbent assay
- MeSH E05.478.567.380.810 – radioallergosorbent test
- MeSH E05.478.567.380.825 – radioimmunoprecipitation assay
- MeSH E05.478.567.380.830 – radioimmunosorbent test
- MeSH E05.478.567.639 – radioimmunoassay
- MeSH E05.478.567.639.405 – immunoradiometric assay
- MeSH E05.478.567.639.810 – radioallergosorbent test
- MeSH E05.478.567.639.825 – radioimmunoprecipitation assay
- MeSH E05.478.567.639.830 – radioimmunosorbent test

==== MeSH E05.478.588 – immunohistochemistry ====
- MeSH E05.478.588.375 – fluorescent antibody technique
- MeSH E05.478.588.375.050 – antibody-coated bacteria test, urinary
- MeSH E05.478.588.375.300 – fluorescent antibody technique, direct
- MeSH E05.478.588.375.310 – fluorescent antibody technique, indirect
- MeSH E05.478.588.375.341 – fluoroimmunoassay
- MeSH E05.478.588.375.341.350 – fluorescence polarization immunoassay
- MeSH E05.478.588.400 – immunoenzyme techniques
- MeSH E05.478.588.400.170 – enzyme-linked immunosorbent assay
- MeSH E05.478.588.400.180 – enzyme multiplied immunoassay technique

==== MeSH E05.478.605 – immunoprecipitation ====
- MeSH E05.478.605.160 – chromatin immunoprecipitation
- MeSH E05.478.605.492 – precipitin tests
- MeSH E05.478.605.492.300 – flocculation tests
- MeSH E05.478.605.492.350 – immunodiffusion
- MeSH E05.478.605.492.350.350 – immunoelectrophoresis
- MeSH E05.478.605.492.350.350.150 – counterimmunoelectrophoresis
- MeSH E05.478.605.492.350.350.350 – immunoelectrophoresis, two-dimensional
- MeSH E05.478.605.825 – radioimmunoprecipitation assay

==== MeSH E05.478.610 – immunosuppression ====
- MeSH E05.478.610.310 – desensitization, immunologic
- MeSH E05.478.610.500 – graft enhancement, immunologic
- MeSH E05.478.610.570 – lymphocyte depletion
- MeSH E05.478.610.800 – transplantation conditioning

=== MeSH E05.490 – interferometry ===
==== MeSH E05.490.630 – microscopy, interference ====
- MeSH E05.490.630.569 – microscopy, phase-contrast

=== MeSH E05.497 – intubation ===
==== MeSH E05.497.578 – intubation, intratracheal ====
- MeSH E05.497.578.475 – laryngeal masks

=== MeSH E05.588 – microchip analytical procedures ===
==== MeSH E05.588.465 – microfluidic analytical techniques ====
- MeSH E05.588.465.340 – electrophoresis, microchip

==== MeSH E05.588.570 – microarray analysis ====
- MeSH E05.588.570.660 – oligonucleotide array sequence analysis
- MeSH E05.588.570.700 – protein array analysis
- MeSH E05.588.570.850 – tissue array analysis

=== MeSH E05.595 – microscopy ===
==== MeSH E05.595.395 – microscopy, confocal ====
- MeSH E05.595.395.500 – laser scanning cytometry

==== MeSH E05.595.402 – microscopy, electron ====
- MeSH E05.595.402.150 – cryoelectron microscopy
- MeSH E05.595.402.250 – electron probe microanalysis
- MeSH E05.595.402.541 – microscopy, electron, scanning
- MeSH E05.595.402.580 – microscopy, electron, transmission
- MeSH E05.595.402.580.480 – microscopy, electron, scanning transmission
- MeSH E05.595.402.580.500 – microscopy, energy-filtering transmission electron
- MeSH E05.595.402.625 – microscopy, immunoelectron

==== MeSH E05.595.458 – microscopy, fluorescence ====
- MeSH E05.595.458.500 – microscopy, fluorescence, multiphoton

==== MeSH E05.595.513 – microscopy, interference ====
- MeSH E05.595.513.569 – microscopy, phase-contrast

==== MeSH E05.595.666 – microscopy, scanning probe ====
- MeSH E05.595.666.400 – microscopy, atomic force
- MeSH E05.595.666.500 – microscopy, scanning tunneling

=== MeSH E05.598 – models, animal ===
==== MeSH E05.598.500 – disease models, animal ====
- MeSH E05.598.500.249 – arthritis, experimental
- MeSH E05.598.500.374 – diabetes mellitus, experimental
- MeSH E05.598.500.468 – liver cirrhosis, experimental
- MeSH E05.598.500.496 – neoplasms, experimental
- MeSH E05.598.500.496.500 – leukemia, experimental
- MeSH E05.598.500.496.750 – liver neoplasms, experimental
- MeSH E05.598.500.496.843 – mammary neoplasms, experimental
- MeSH E05.598.500.496.937 – melanoma, experimental
- MeSH E05.598.500.496.968 – sarcoma, experimental
- MeSH E05.598.500.500 – nervous system autoimmune disease, experimental
- MeSH E05.598.500.500.500 – encephalomyelitis, autoimmune, experimental
- MeSH E05.598.500.500.750 – myasthenia gravis, autoimmune, experimental
- MeSH E05.598.500.500.875 – neuritis, autoimmune, experimental
- MeSH E05.598.500.750 – radiation injuries, experimental

=== MeSH E05.601 – molecular probe techniques ===
==== MeSH E05.601.123 – biosensing techniques ====
- MeSH E05.601.123.700 – surface plasmon resonance

==== MeSH E05.601.495 – immunoassay ====
- MeSH E05.601.495.320 – immunoblotting
- MeSH E05.601.495.320.200 – blotting, western
- MeSH E05.601.495.350 – immunoenzyme techniques
- MeSH E05.601.495.350.170 – enzyme-linked immunosorbent assay
- MeSH E05.601.495.350.180 – enzyme multiplied immunoassay technique
- MeSH E05.601.495.380 – immunosorbent techniques
- MeSH E05.601.495.380.360 – enzyme-linked immunosorbent assay
- MeSH E05.601.495.380.810 – radioallergosorbent test
- MeSH E05.601.495.380.825 – radioimmunoprecipitation assay
- MeSH E05.601.495.380.830 – radioimmunosorbent test
- MeSH E05.601.495.639 – radioimmunoassay
- MeSH E05.601.495.639.405 – immunoradiometric assay
- MeSH E05.601.495.639.810 – radioallergosorbent test
- MeSH E05.601.495.639.825 – radioimmunoprecipitation assay
- MeSH E05.601.495.639.830 – radioimmunosorbent test

==== MeSH E05.601.690 – protein interaction mapping ====
- MeSH E05.601.690.149 – blotting, far-western
- MeSH E05.601.690.300 – epitope mapping
- MeSH E05.601.690.650 – two-hybrid system techniques

=== MeSH E05.624 – neoplasm transplantation ===
==== MeSH E05.624.850 – xenograft model antitumor assays ====
- MeSH E05.624.850.830 – subrenal capsule assay

=== MeSH E05.680 – perfusion ===
==== MeSH E05.680.730 – reperfusion ====
- MeSH E05.680.730.600 – myocardial reperfusion

=== MeSH E05.723 – physical stimulation ===
==== MeSH E05.723.402 – electric stimulation ====
- MeSH E05.723.402.403 – electroshock

=== MeSH E05.760 – preservation, biological ===
==== MeSH E05.760.156 – cryopreservation ====
- MeSH E05.760.156.260 – freeze drying
- MeSH E05.760.156.260.270 – freeze substitution

==== MeSH E05.760.833 – tissue preservation ====
- MeSH E05.760.833.230 – blood preservation
- MeSH E05.760.833.445 – cold ischemia
- MeSH E05.760.833.660 – organ preservation
- MeSH E05.760.833.890 – semen preservation

=== MeSH E05.799 – radiometry ===
==== MeSH E05.799.638 – radiation monitoring ====
- MeSH E05.799.638.231 – body burden
- MeSH E05.799.638.420 – film dosimetry
- MeSH E05.799.638.785 – thermoluminescent dosimetry

==== MeSH E05.799.830 – spectrometry, x-ray emission ====
- MeSH E05.799.830.360 – electron probe microanalysis

=== MeSH E05.820 – reproductive techniques ===
==== MeSH E05.820.150 – breeding ====
- MeSH E05.820.150.360 – estrus detection
- MeSH E05.820.150.370 – estrus synchronization
- MeSH E05.820.150.390 – hybridization, genetic
- MeSH E05.820.150.520 – inbreeding

==== MeSH E05.820.800 – reproductive techniques, assisted ====
- MeSH E05.820.800.500 – embryo transfer
- MeSH E05.820.800.750 – fertilization in vitro
- MeSH E05.820.800.750.700 – sperm injections, intracytoplasmic
- MeSH E05.820.800.800 – posthumous conception
- MeSH E05.820.800.875 – gamete intrafallopian transfer
- MeSH E05.820.800.937 – insemination, artificial
- MeSH E05.820.800.937.515 – insemination, artificial, heterologous
- MeSH E05.820.800.937.525 – insemination, artificial, homologous
- MeSH E05.820.800.968 – oocyte donation
- MeSH E05.820.800.984 – ovulation induction
- MeSH E05.820.800.984.500 – superovulation
- MeSH E05.820.800.992 – zygote intrafallopian transfer

=== MeSH E05.916 – technology, pharmaceutical ===
==== MeSH E05.916.160 – combinatorial chemistry techniques ====
- MeSH E05.916.160.500 – selex aptamer technique

=== MeSH E05.940 – toxicity tests ===
==== MeSH E05.940.074 – acute toxicity tests ====
- MeSH E05.940.074.500 – skin irritancy tests

==== MeSH E05.940.560 – mutagenicity tests ====
- MeSH E05.940.560.150 – comet assay

=== MeSH E05.980 – whole-body irradiation ===
The list continues at List of MeSH codes (E06).
