= List of MeSH codes (E06) =

The following is a partial list of the "E" codes for Medical Subject Headings (MeSH), as defined by the United States National Library of Medicine (NLM).

This list continues the information at List of MeSH codes (E05). Codes following these are found at List of MeSH codes (E07). For other MeSH codes, see List of MeSH codes.

The source for this content is the set of 2006 MeSH Trees from the NLM.

== MeSH E06 – dentistry ==
=== MeSH E06.045 – anesthesia, dental ===
- MeSH E06.045.481 – hypnosis, dental

=== MeSH E06.095 – dental bonding ===
- MeSH E06.095.170 – cementation
- MeSH E06.095.585 – dental etching
- MeSH E06.095.585.111 – acid etching, dental

=== MeSH E06.170 – dental care ===
- MeSH E06.170.100 – dental care for aged
- MeSH E06.170.152 – dental care for children
- MeSH E06.170.205 – dental care for chronically ill
- MeSH E06.170.310 – dental care for disabled

=== MeSH E06.186 – dental equipment ===
- MeSH E06.186.210 – dental articulators
- MeSH E06.186.250 – dental devices, home care
- MeSH E06.186.376 – dental high-speed equipment
- MeSH E06.186.501 – dental instruments
- MeSH E06.186.501.630 – matrix bands
- MeSH E06.186.670 – rubber dams

=== MeSH E06.208 – dental health surveys ===
- MeSH E06.208.250 – dental plaque index
- MeSH E06.208.266 – dmf index
- MeSH E06.208.576 – oral hygiene index
- MeSH E06.208.720 – periodontal index

=== MeSH E06.231 – dental implantation ===
- MeSH E06.231.310 – dental implantation, endosseous
- MeSH E06.231.310.340 – blade implantation
- MeSH E06.231.310.360 – dental implantation, endosseous, endodontic
- MeSH E06.231.482 – dental implantation, subperiosteal

=== MeSH E06.276 – dental occlusion ===
- MeSH E06.276.125 – bite force
- MeSH E06.276.293 – dental occlusion, balanced
- MeSH E06.276.459 – dental occlusion, centric
- MeSH E06.276.459.733 – vertical dimension

=== MeSH E06.323 – dentistry, operative ===
- MeSH E06.323.115 – crown lengthening
- MeSH E06.323.225 – dental cavity lining
- MeSH E06.323.400 – dental restoration failure
- MeSH E06.323.428 – dental restoration, permanent
- MeSH E06.323.428.100 – crowns
- MeSH E06.323.428.100.500 – post and core technique
- MeSH E06.323.428.275 – inlays
- MeSH E06.323.428.550 – marginal adaptation (dentistry)
- MeSH E06.323.528 – dental restoration, temporary
- MeSH E06.323.528.250 – crowns
- MeSH E06.323.528.250.500 – post and core technique

=== MeSH E06.342 – diagnosis, oral ===
- MeSH E06.342.250 – dental caries activity tests
- MeSH E06.342.377 – dental pulp test
- MeSH E06.342.488 – photography, dental
- MeSH E06.342.764 – radiography, dental
- MeSH E06.342.764.142 – age determination by teeth
- MeSH E06.342.764.600 – radiography, bitewing
- MeSH E06.342.764.716 – radiography, dental, digital
- MeSH E06.342.764.750 – radiography, panoramic
- MeSH E06.342.764.793 – sialography

=== MeSH E06.397 – endodontics ===
- MeSH E06.397.102 – apicoectomy
- MeSH E06.397.345 – dental implantation, endosseous, endodontic
- MeSH E06.397.370 – dental pulp capping
- MeSH E06.397.633 – pulpectomy
- MeSH E06.397.695 – pulpotomy
- MeSH E06.397.778 – root canal therapy
- MeSH E06.397.778.377 – dental pulp devitalization
- MeSH E06.397.778.778 – root canal obturation
- MeSH E06.397.778.778.648 – retrograde obturation
- MeSH E06.397.778.889 – root canal preparation
- MeSH E06.397.898 – tooth replantation

=== MeSH E06.420 – esthetics, dental ===
- MeSH E06.420.500 – enamel microabrasion
- MeSH E06.420.750 – tooth bleaching

=== MeSH E06.520 – jaw relation record ===
- MeSH E06.520.200 – centric relation

=== MeSH E06.645 – oral surgical procedures ===
- MeSH E06.645.100 – apicoectomy
- MeSH E06.645.350 – gingivectomy
- MeSH E06.645.355 – gingivoplasty
- MeSH E06.645.380 – glossectomy
- MeSH E06.645.440 – jaw fixation techniques
- MeSH E06.645.500 – mandibular advancement
- MeSH E06.645.510 – maxillofacial prosthesis implantation
- MeSH E06.645.510.500 – mandibular prosthesis implantation
- MeSH E06.645.550 – oral surgical procedures, preprosthetic
- MeSH E06.645.550.100 – alveolar ridge augmentation
- MeSH E06.645.550.110 – alveolectomy
- MeSH E06.645.550.120 – alveoloplasty
- MeSH E06.645.550.280 – dental implantation
- MeSH E06.645.550.280.280 – dental implantation, endosseous
- MeSH E06.645.550.280.280.150 – blade implantation
- MeSH E06.645.550.280.280.280 – dental implantation, endosseous, endodontic
- MeSH E06.645.550.280.290 – dental implantation, subperiosteal
- MeSH E06.645.550.800 – vestibuloplasty
- MeSH E06.645.575 – osteotomy, le fort
- MeSH E06.645.700 – tooth extraction
- MeSH E06.645.700.680 – serial extraction
- MeSH E06.645.710 – tooth replantation

=== MeSH E06.658 – orthodontics ===
- MeSH E06.658.224 – mandibular advancement
- MeSH E06.658.337 – orthodontic anchorage procedures
- MeSH E06.658.450 – orthodontic appliance design
- MeSH E06.658.453 – orthodontic appliances
- MeSH E06.658.453.510 – occlusal splints
- MeSH E06.658.453.560 – orthodontic appliances, functional
- MeSH E06.658.453.560.100 – activator appliances
- MeSH E06.658.453.578 – orthodontic appliances, removable
- MeSH E06.658.453.578.100 – activator appliances
- MeSH E06.658.453.578.360 – extraoral traction appliances
- MeSH E06.658.453.590 – orthodontic brackets
- MeSH E06.658.453.637 – orthodontic retainers
- MeSH E06.658.453.684 – orthodontic wires
- MeSH E06.658.578 – orthodontics, corrective
- MeSH E06.658.578.099 – crown lengthening
- MeSH E06.658.578.200 – occlusal adjustment
- MeSH E06.658.578.225 – orthodontic extrusion
- MeSH E06.658.578.229 – orthodontic space closure
- MeSH E06.658.578.458 – palatal expansion technique
- MeSH E06.658.578.836 – tooth movement
- MeSH E06.658.641 – orthodontics, interceptive
- MeSH E06.658.641.890 – serial extraction
- MeSH E06.658.703 – orthodontics, preventive
- MeSH E06.658.703.675 – space maintenance

=== MeSH E06.721 – periodontics ===
- MeSH E06.721.189 – dental prophylaxis
- MeSH E06.721.189.350 – dental scaling
- MeSH E06.721.189.350.650 – root planing
- MeSH E06.721.321 – gingivectomy
- MeSH E06.721.384 – gingivoplasty
- MeSH E06.721.485 – guided tissue regeneration, periodontal
- MeSH E06.721.595 – periodontal dressings
- MeSH E06.721.658 – periodontal index
- MeSH E06.721.721 – periodontal prosthesis
- MeSH E06.721.721.680 – periodontal splints
- MeSH E06.721.874 – subgingival curettage
- MeSH E06.721.874.650 – root planing

=== MeSH E06.761 – preventive dentistry ===
- MeSH E06.761.227 – dental prophylaxis
- MeSH E06.761.227.350 – dental scaling
- MeSH E06.761.227.350.650 – root planing
- MeSH E06.761.382 – fluoridation
- MeSH E06.761.599 – mouth protectors
- MeSH E06.761.726 – oral hygiene
- MeSH E06.761.726.292 – dental devices, home care
- MeSH E06.761.726.794 – toothbrushing

=== MeSH E06.780 – prosthodontics ===
- MeSH E06.780.250 – dental casting technique
- MeSH E06.780.314 – dental implantation
- MeSH E06.780.314.310 – dental implantation, endosseous
- MeSH E06.780.314.310.340 – blade implantation
- MeSH E06.780.314.310.360 – dental implantation, endosseous, endodontic
- MeSH E06.780.314.482 – dental implantation, subperiosteal
- MeSH E06.780.345 – dental prosthesis
- MeSH E06.780.345.250 – crowns
- MeSH E06.780.345.250.500 – post and core technique
- MeSH E06.780.345.500 – dental abutments
- MeSH E06.780.345.562 – dental clasps
- MeSH E06.780.345.593 – dental implants
- MeSH E06.780.345.593.185 – dental implants, single-tooth
- MeSH E06.780.345.625 – dental prosthesis design
- MeSH E06.780.345.630 – dental prosthesis, implant-supported
- MeSH E06.780.345.656 – dental prosthesis repair
- MeSH E06.780.345.687 – dental prosthesis retention
- MeSH E06.780.345.725 – dental restoration failure
- MeSH E06.780.345.737 – dental restoration, permanent
- MeSH E06.780.345.737.100 – crowns
- MeSH E06.780.345.737.100.500 – post and core technique
- MeSH E06.780.345.737.125 – dental restoration wear
- MeSH E06.780.345.737.250 – dental veneers
- MeSH E06.780.345.737.500 – inlays
- MeSH E06.780.345.740 – dental restoration, temporary
- MeSH E06.780.345.750 – dental veneers
- MeSH E06.780.345.760 – dentures
- MeSH E06.780.345.760.281 – denture bases
- MeSH E06.780.345.760.290 – denture, complete
- MeSH E06.780.345.760.290.254 – denture, complete, immediate
- MeSH E06.780.345.760.290.379 – denture, complete, lower
- MeSH E06.780.345.760.290.504 – denture, complete, upper
- MeSH E06.780.345.760.300 – denture design
- MeSH E06.780.345.760.357 – denture liners
- MeSH E06.780.345.760.395 – denture, overlay
- MeSH E06.780.345.760.433 – denture, partial
- MeSH E06.780.345.760.433.271 – denture, partial, fixed
- MeSH E06.780.345.760.433.271.260 – denture, partial, fixed, resin-bonded
- MeSH E06.780.345.760.433.342 – denture, partial, immediate
- MeSH E06.780.345.760.433.413 – denture, partial, removable
- MeSH E06.780.345.760.433.484 – denture, partial, temporary
- MeSH E06.780.345.760.433.555 – denture precision attachment
- MeSH E06.780.345.760.471 – denture rebasing
- MeSH E06.780.345.760.500 – denture repair
- MeSH E06.780.345.760.550 – denture retention
- MeSH E06.780.345.817 – inlays
- MeSH E06.780.345.850 – palatal obturators
- MeSH E06.780.345.875 – tooth, artificial
- MeSH E06.780.895 – tissue conditioning (dental)

=== MeSH E06.912 – technology, dental ===
- MeSH E06.912.115 – dental casting technique
- MeSH E06.912.130 – dental impression technique
- MeSH E06.912.145 – dental prosthesis design
- MeSH E06.912.160 – dental prosthesis repair
- MeSH E06.912.190 – dental soldering
- MeSH E06.912.250 – denture design
- MeSH E06.912.275 – denture identification marking
- MeSH E06.912.280 – denture rebasing
- MeSH E06.912.285 – denture repair
- MeSH E06.912.675 – orthodontic appliance design

=== MeSH E06.931 – tooth preparation ===
- MeSH E06.931.325 – dental cavity preparation
- MeSH E06.931.625 – root canal preparation
- MeSH E06.931.750 – tooth preparation, prosthodontic

=== MeSH E06.950 – tooth remineralization ===
The list continues at List of MeSH codes (E07).
