= Gingivoplasty =

Medical procedure

- ICD-9-CM: 24.2
- MeSH: D005893

Gingivoplasty is the process by which the gingiva are reshaped to correct deformities. Gingivoplasty is similar to gingivectomy but with a different objective. This is a procedure performed to eliminate periodontal pockets along with the reshaping as part of the technique. This procedure is followed to create physiological gingival contours with the sole purpose of recontouring the gingiva in the absence of the pockets.

Gingival and periodontal disease often produces deformities in the gingiva that are conducive to the accumulation of plaque and food debris, which prolong and aggregate the disease process.

Such deformities include the following:-

1. Gingival clefts and craters
1. Crater- like interdental papilla caused by acute necrotizing ulcerative gingivitis
1. Gingival enlargements

Gingivoplasty is accomplished with a periodontal knife, a scalpel, rotary coarse diamond stones, electrodes or laser. The technique resembles that of the festooning of an artificial denture, which consists of tapering the gingival margin, creating a scalloped marginal outline, thinning the attached gingiva, creating the vertical interdental grooves and shaping the interdental papillae.

With an external bevel incision, gingivoplasty can restore the gingiva to a normal functional shape. During excision, laser and electrosurgery may be used to improve Hemostasis. In cosmetic cases, removal of excess gingival tissue exposes more of the tooth when the gingiva makes the crown appear visually short.
