= Freeze-fracture =

Effects from freeze and thaw cycles

Freeze-fracture is a natural fracturing phenomenon that leads to processes like erosion of the Earth's crust or deterioration of food via freeze-thaw cycles. Freeze-fracture can be induced artificially to view in detail the properties of a material. Fracture during freezing often results from the expansion of crystallizing water. Crystallization is also a factor leading to chemical changes of a substance due to changes in the crystal surroundings, called eutectic formation.

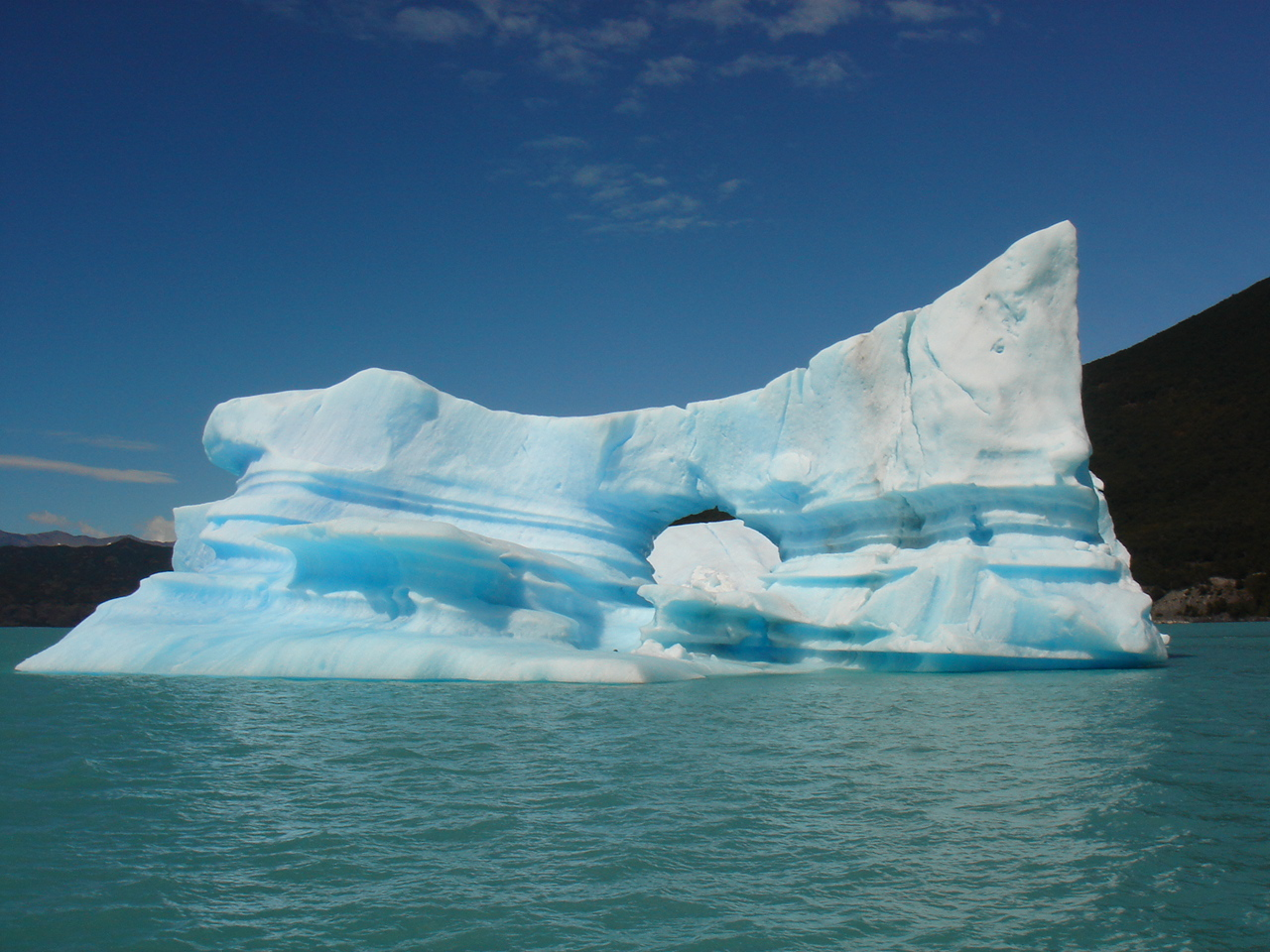
Natural freeze-fracture occurs when an iceberg fractured off a glacier, revealing the layering hidden within.

Imaging the fractured surface of a frozen substance enables its interior to be investigated, as illustrated by the picture of the iceberg, a fractured piece of glacier. By photographing at high magnifications, a fractured object's substructure and the changes that occur during freezing can be studied. When fractured surfaces are imaged in detail, changes occurring during fracture, immediately after fracture, and even during sample preparation must be considered when inferring the unbroken material's structure. The often relatively cold temperatures needed to make an object solid enough to fracture, and the fracture process itself, stress and deform the material. Imaging of fine detail under sub-zero conditions is difficult. The material will start to warm again when removed to a position for photography. Ambient gases, often water vapor, will condense on the cold surfaces, reacting with them, obscuring detail and further warming the object, allowing it to reshape.

== Freezing considerations ==
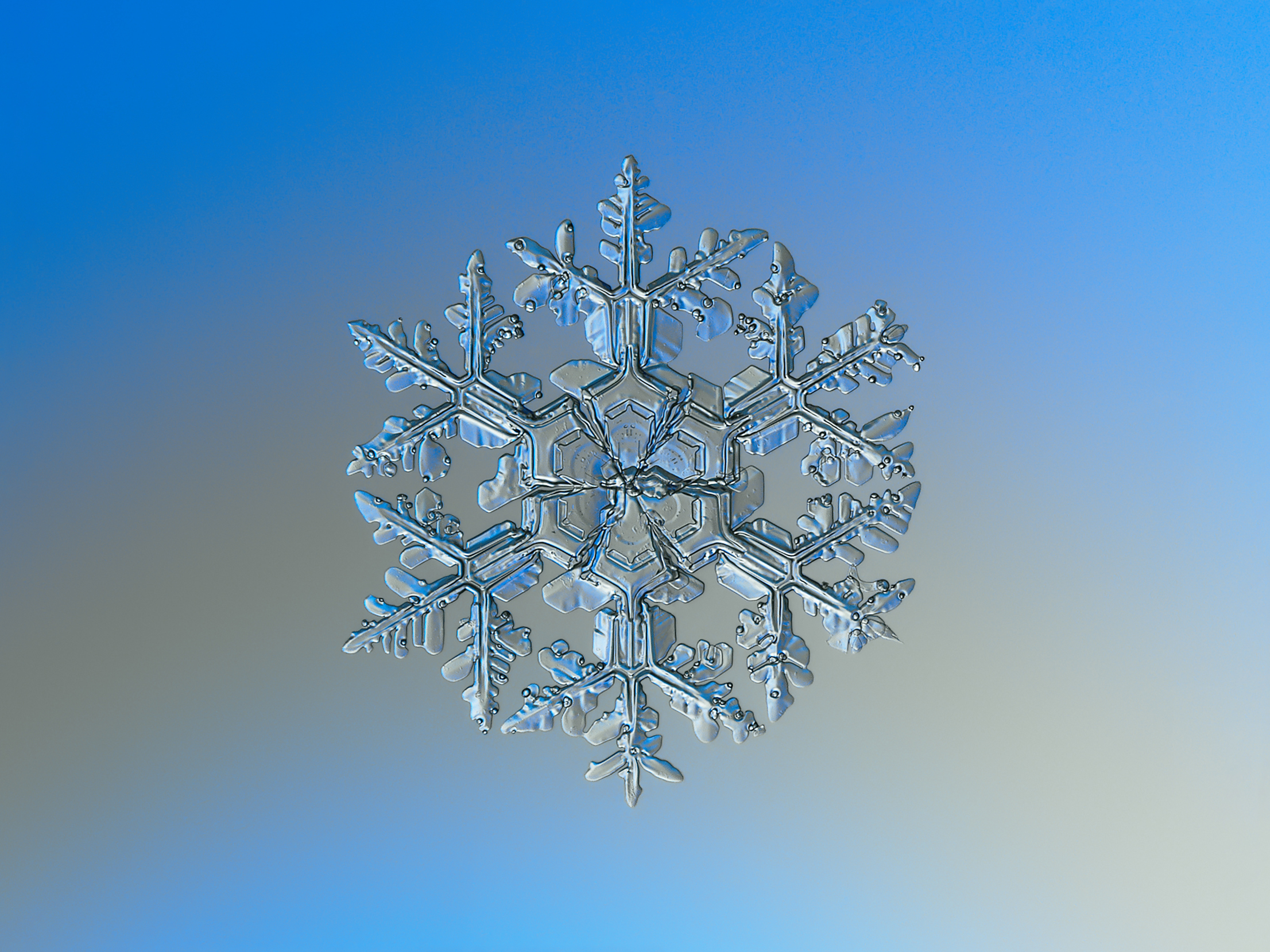
Snowflake macro photography

"Freezing" a substance is a relative term, often relative to ambient temperatures. Freezing a liquid or gas into a solid allows for fracture, but has different effects depending on the material and freezing speed. Slow freezing allows the material time to re-arrange itself internally. In the example of water, ice forming slowly results in larger crystals, leading to a clear glass-like substance. If frozen quickly, as with snow, the crystals are smaller and less organized, scattering light and appearing white.

=== Elastic materials ===
Elastic solids generally become less elastic the cooler they get, making fracturing easier. For example, plastic hoses are flexible on hot days and less flexible and prone to cracking on cold days. Storage of critical items such as blood products in plastic bags must take into account the effect of freezing on the blood, but also the changing plasticity of the storage bags. While many synthetic and natural polymers become progressively less elastic with reducing temperature, they do not usually crystallize, unless they also contain a free liquid, such as water in plants and soils or plasticizers in plastics.

=== Liquids ===
Liquids reduced in temperature will become solid enough to be fractured. The abundance of water on Earth—and particularly in living organisms and soils—means that frozen water often provides the rigidity needed for an otherwise less brittle object to fracture; additionally, the formation of ice crystals within the object can significantly damage its interior structure. Changes in the eutectic around the forming crystals are also significant; in the case of cooling solder, this is actually advantageous. Freeze-fracture can occur as part of the freezing process, particularly with liquids that expand as they crystallize, such as water. Such fracture is termed pre-fracture.

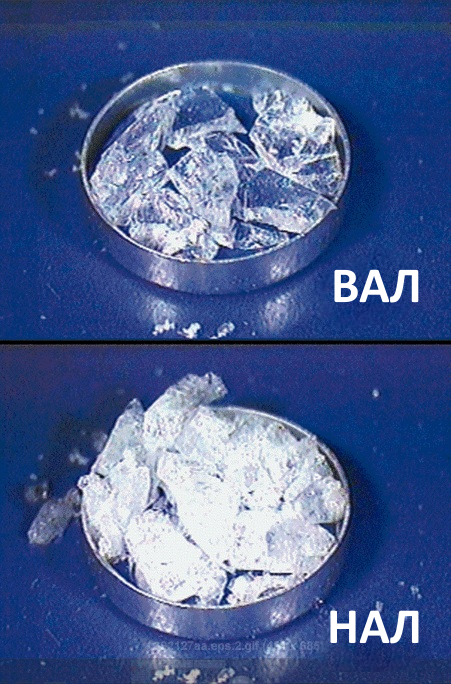
Two forms of amorphous ice: high density (HDA; top) and low density (LDA; bottom)

To reduce damage from crystallization, cryopreservatives (which reduce ice crystal damage) are often used, but may themselves be toxic to living cells in the concentrations required. For small objects, freezing of liquids can be rapid enough for limited or no crystallization. In the case of water, very rapid freezing leads to vitreous amorphous ice rather than crystalline ice, resulting in no detectable damage.

=== Solids ===
Perhaps counterintuitively, solids also change into different states when frozen. They may be said to become "more solid". For example, iron in its various forms will become more brittle at lower temperatures. Steels exhibit low-temperature brittleness with a transition temperature from ductile to brittle fracture (TTDB) that varies from about −100 °C to about +100 °C depending on the alloy composition and processing. As the solids change with temperature so does the way they fracture.

=== Gases ===
Gases cooled sufficiently also will solidify enough to fracture, such as with solid carbon dioxide (dry ice). Since gases have little structure when used under normal conditions, there are currently no investigations into their solid phase structures using freeze-fracture. Studies may increase concerning extra-planetary objects with surface temperatures cold enough to solidify elements that exist as gases on Earth. Currently, only the unfractured structures are being investigated, such as solid carbon dioxide on the Moon or solid methane and nitrogen on Pluto.

== Fracturing considerations ==
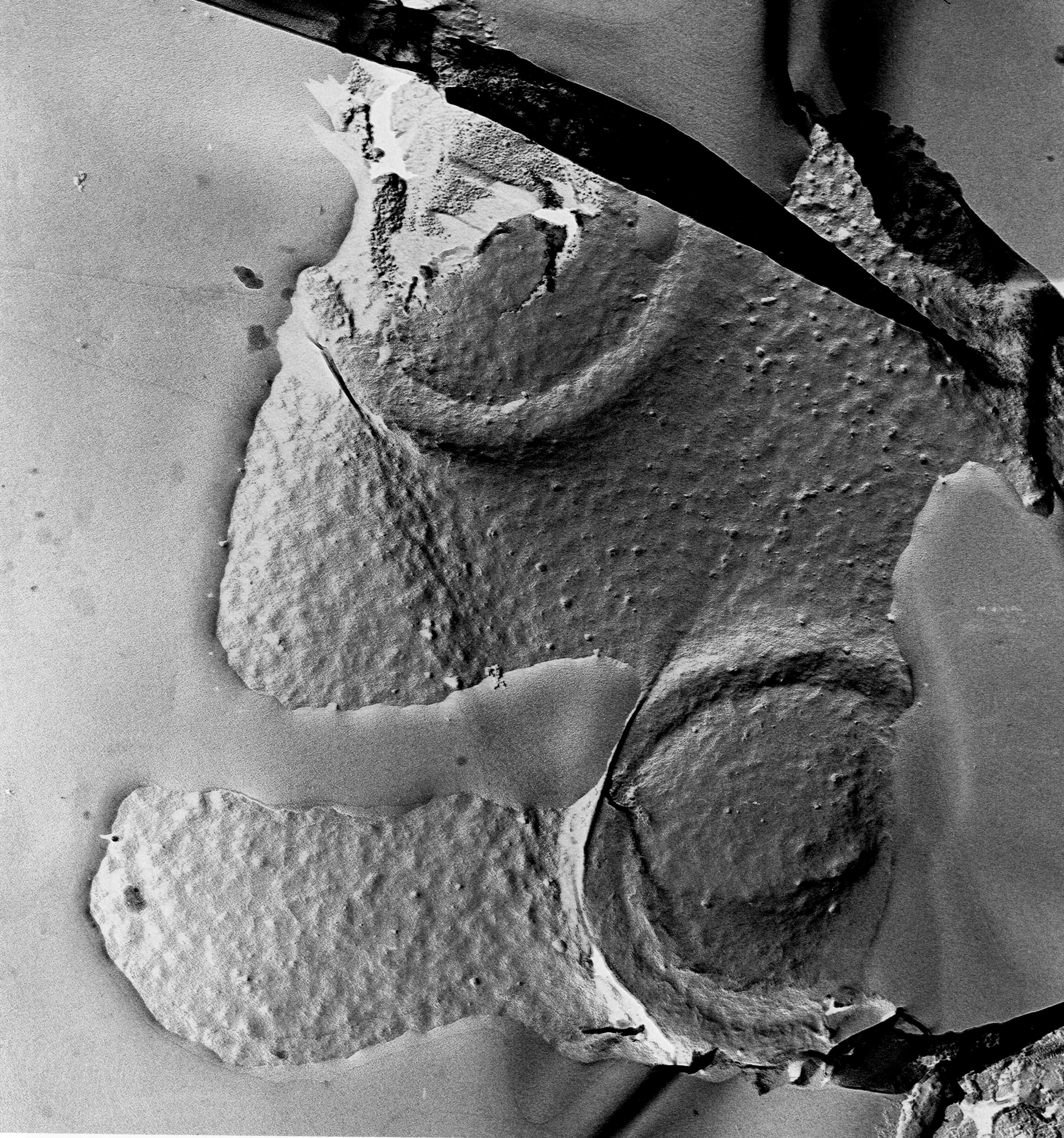
Freeze-fracture and replicated yeast cell at -50°C with two prominent circular bud scars. The ice surrounding the cell melted due to the heat of the fracture, flowed a few microns, and quickly refroze again.

=== The energy of the fracture ===
To split a material into two pieces requires the material to be put under enough stress to break it. The amount of stress applied to an object prior to its fracture determines the amount of energy available for the fracture to take place. Excessive stress results in multiple almost-simultaneous fractures, as when shattering a sheet of glass with a hammer. Sufficient but not too much stress normally results in a single fracture. Even with a single fracture any slight excess in stress will lead to fracture that propagates more quickly with more energy and higher temperatures at the fracture face. The higher energy can also result in distortions called plastic deformation or even in minute secondary fractures that break fragments off the main fracture face. If the stress is less focused, a larger volume will be stressed, leading to a slower propagation of the fracture with lower temperatures at the fracture face. Force in excess of that required for a single fracture plane to form is usually released as a combination of significant heating, plastic deformation, and secondary fracture.

=== Temperature ===
Once cooled sufficiently to fracture, a sample is often cooled further. Stressing and fracturing a sample produces considerable heat, easily enough to thaw a sample again if the temperature is not well below the melting point.

== Applications ==
Here are a few visible and commonplace examples of freeze-fracture. Better-known examples relate to preventing freeze-fracture damage to water supply pipes or engine cooling systems in colder climates.

=== Daily life ===
==== Ice for cooling ====
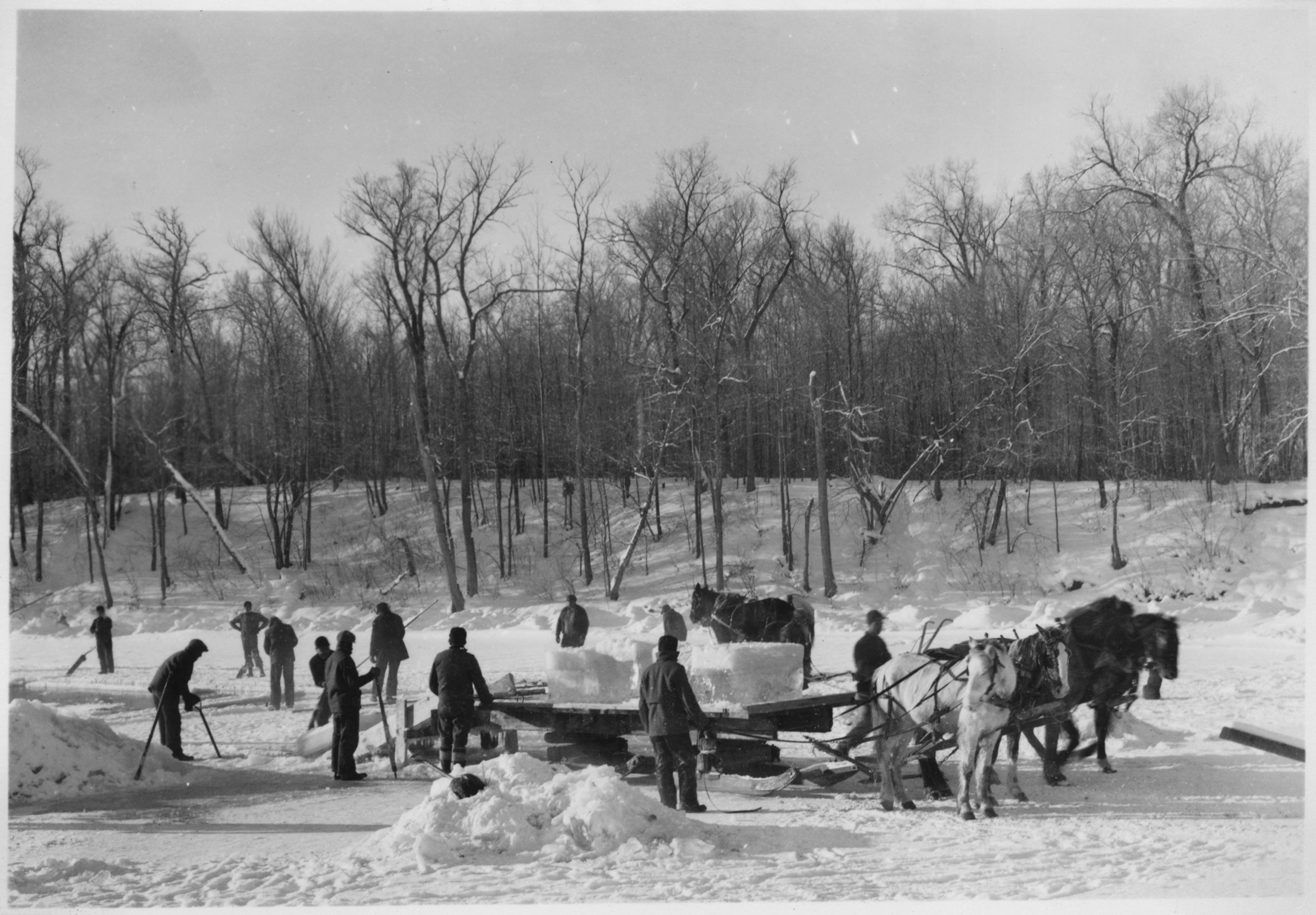
Ice blocks are cut and loaded onto a horse drawn sled circa 1935

A very common requirement is cooling using ice. Large blocks of cut ice were once the most common way of transporting ice. Once transported, the ice would be later fractured into smaller pieces for practical use. Today, ice machines produce ready-to-use ice cubes that are fractured by blending them into drinks and foods (e.g., slushy, ais kacang).

==== Tempered glass ====
During production, the exterior surface of tempered glass is rapidly cooled from the liquid state so that it is frozen solid while the center of the glass is still liquid. As a result, the glass becomes highly stressed. When a single fracture is initiated, the considerable stored energy in the prestressing is released. The sudden release of the energy fractures the entire pane into smaller, less damaging pieces, such as with a car windscreen.

=== Engineering ===
For practical purposes most devices manufactured have an "operating temperature". Often these relate to fragility induced by lowering temperatures increasing the likelihood of pre-fracture or fracture.

==== Steel ====
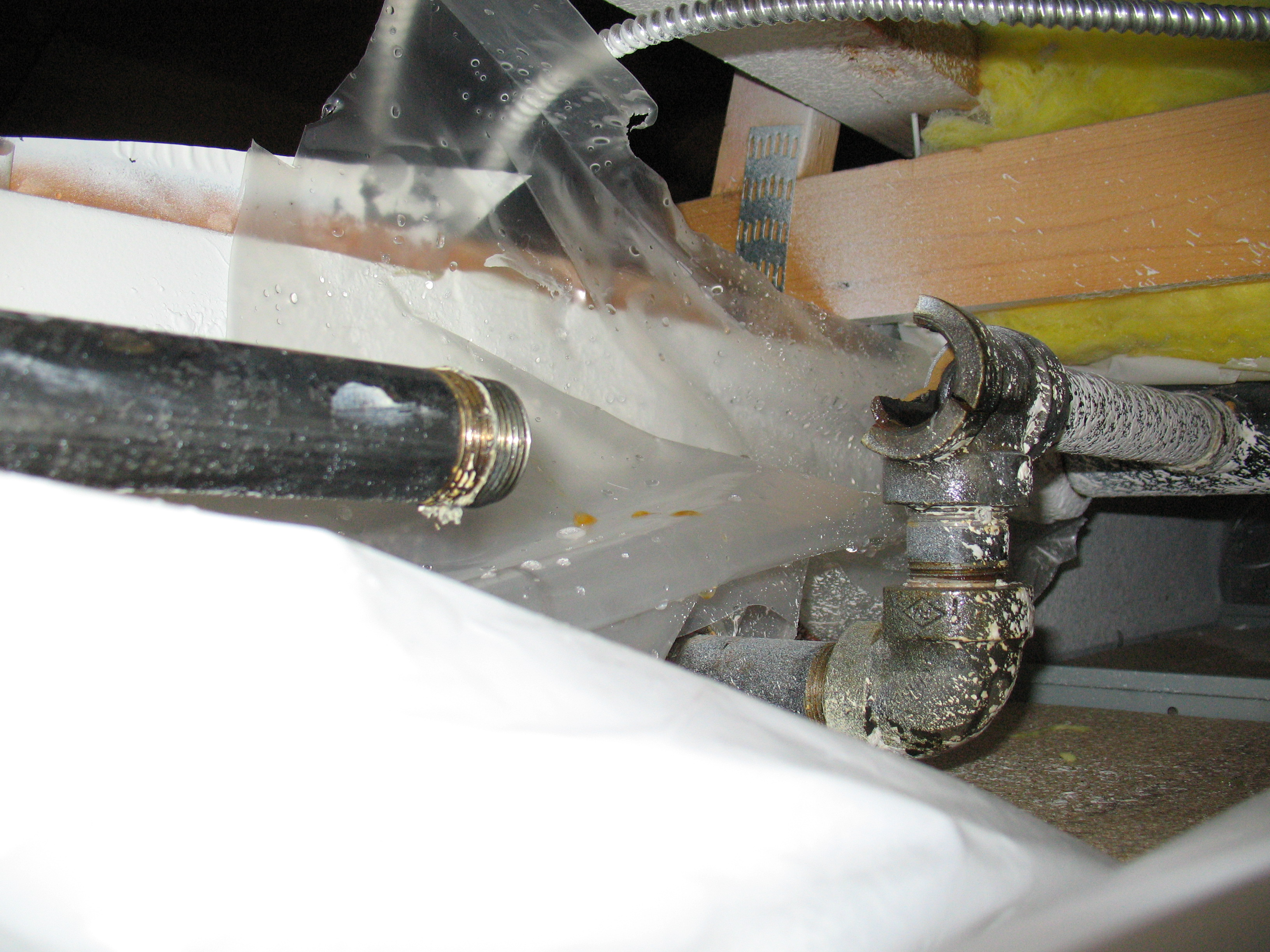
Fracture failure of a steel pipe due to cold temperatures

Iron and its various alloys including steel undergo changes in their resistance to fracturing with temperature. These changes can occur at higher temperatures as the steel solidifies during manufacture and also again at lower temperatures below 100 °C including below the freezing point of water at 0 °C. This has implications in the design and building of steel civil engineering structures such as bridges, buildings, and pipes.

==== Composite materials ====
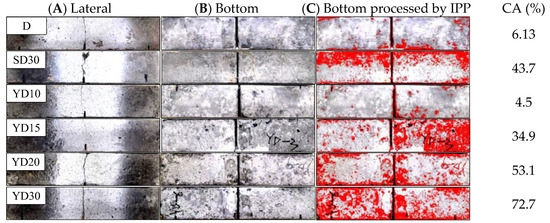
Concrete fracture

Freeze-thaw cycles can weaken composite materials. The effects of water freezing within composite materials can be studied and predicted with models. Concrete is a widely used composite material that is susceptible to freeze-fracture.

=== Chemistry ===
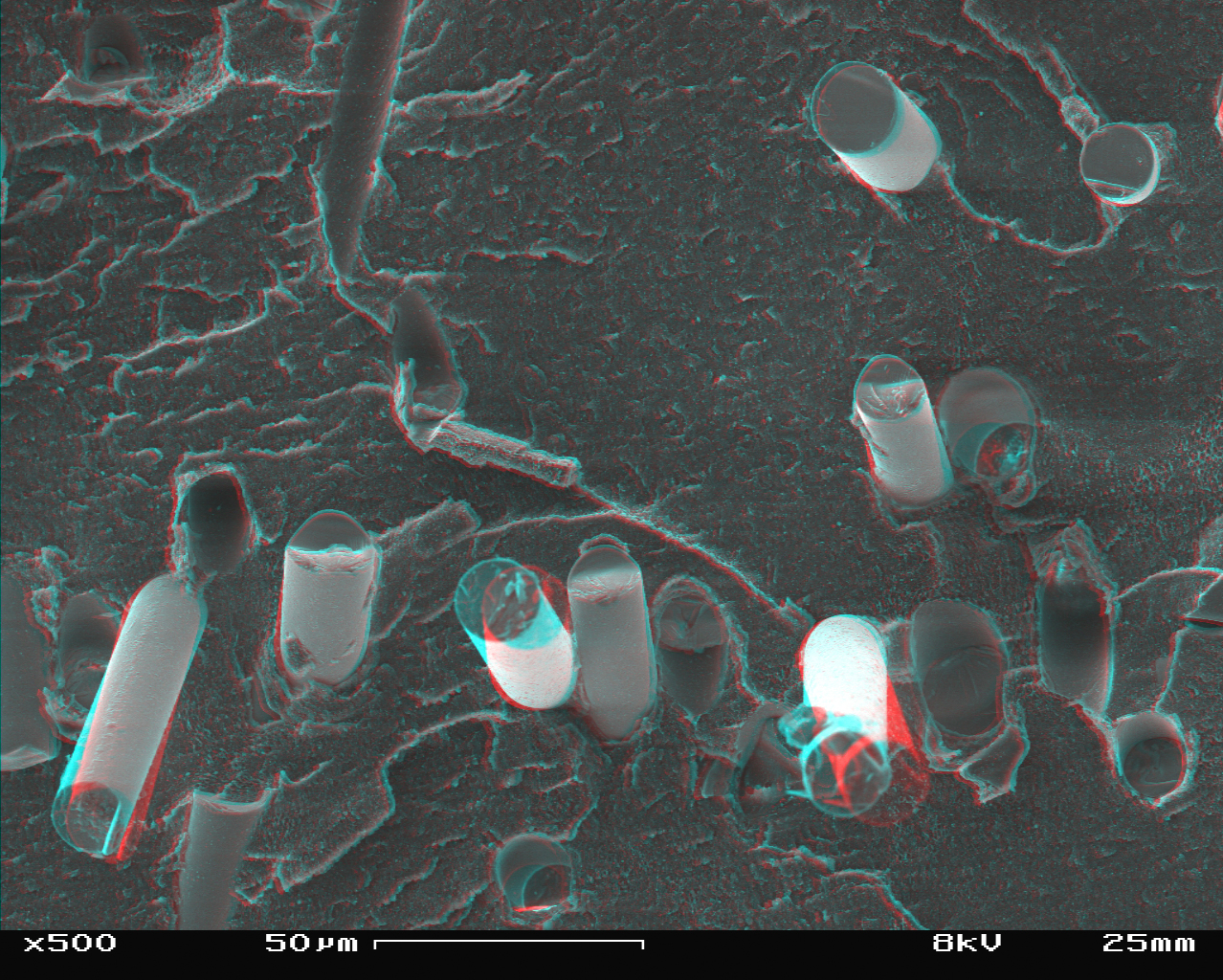
Platinum coated surface of fracture face of glass-reinforced plastic (SEM Stereo 500x)

==== Composite material substructure ====
Materials and colloid sciences use freeze-fracture techniques to investigate the nature of more complex substances. Even without visualizing the atoms and molecules, the shapes and textures of the interface between reacting substances will impact how they behave and interact.

==== Solder ====
Eutectic solders rely on the re-distribution of chemistry within the solder as they cool from liquid to solid. This can be used to create less toxic, lower-temperature solders that still bind well enough to prevent fracturing under operating conditions.

=== Biology ===
Freeze-fracture microscopy is extensively used in biology to study biological cells and proteins in detail, without chemical fixation, plastic or wax embedding, or chemical staining prior to sectioning.

=== Freeze-fracture-replication ===
Freeze fracture under liquid nitrogen followed by production of a platinum/carbon replica

The first documented systematic visualization of a frozen, fractured surface to look at the structure of the fracture face itself was done in the mid-1950s. Russell L. Steere was observing virus particles and became concerned that conventional preparation techniques for electron microscopy, which included dehydration, may be altering the virus structure. Although freezing the sample would also cause changes, he considered trying. A "planed surface" was created on the frozen material using a knife. Due to the conditions required for the transmission electron microscope used at the time, the rapidly frozen and fractured virus itself could not be viewed directly. Instead Steere made a carbon reinforced chromium replica of the fractured surface based on a procedure devised by others. Steere overcame the problem of ice crystals forming on the fractured viruses by etching them away prior to making the copy for viewing, as others had done. The additional etching step adds additional variations to the appearance of the original fractured surface but is essential to remove condensates from the surface.

==== Commercialization of biological freeze-fracture ====
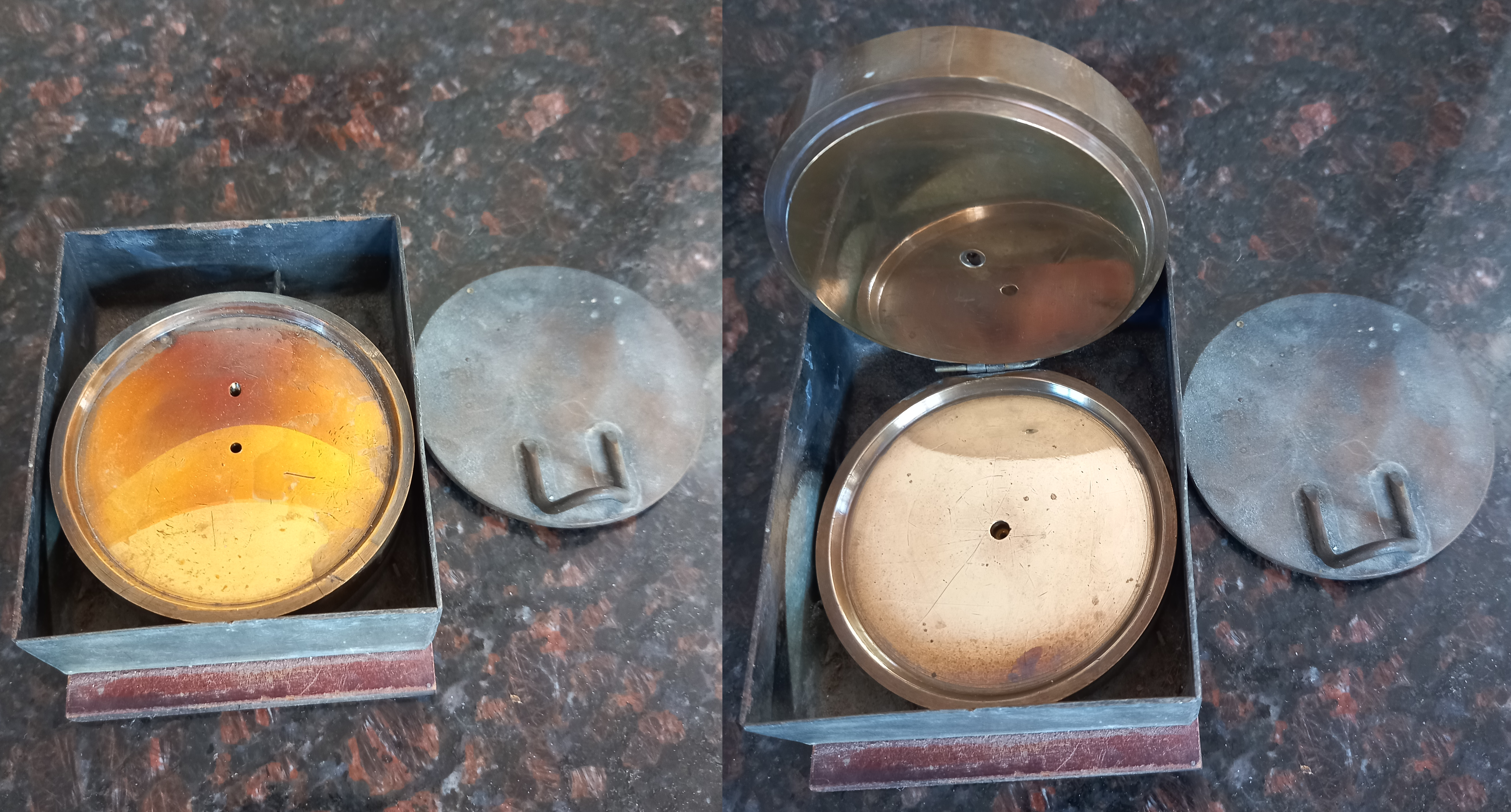
Freeze-fracture replication shielding block built in 1984, after Bullivant and Ames 1966

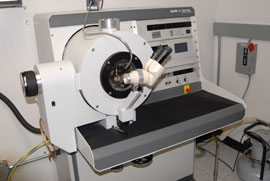
Commercial Freeze Etching Replication device circa 2000

With the principles of visualizing a freeze-fractured surface for electron microscopy established, Moore automated and commercialized the "freeze-fracture-etch-replication" method in 1961, calling it "Steer's freeze-etching method". Believing a sharp knife was required to achieve a controlled fracture, he used a microtome in a vacuum chamber to fracture the specimens.

Later, much cheaper, non-commercial alternatives that did not rely on a microtome or etching to clean the fracture face were established. Adequate shielding from contamination in the vacuum required for replication meant etching was not required to clean the fracture face. This technique was called simply "freeze-fracture replication" (Bullivant & Ames). This method cheaply modified standard coating machines already routinely used in electron microscope laboratories, initially using a Meccano set. For smaller electron microscopy labs, this technique was easier than employing a large, specialized, commercial piece of freeze-fracture etch replication equipment. The method also allowed for much greater variations to the way the specimens could be fractured.

==== Viewing inside membranes ====
During the 1960s–1980s, the cell's lipid bilayer was shown to split into two halves, revealing the interior when fractured under suitable conditions.

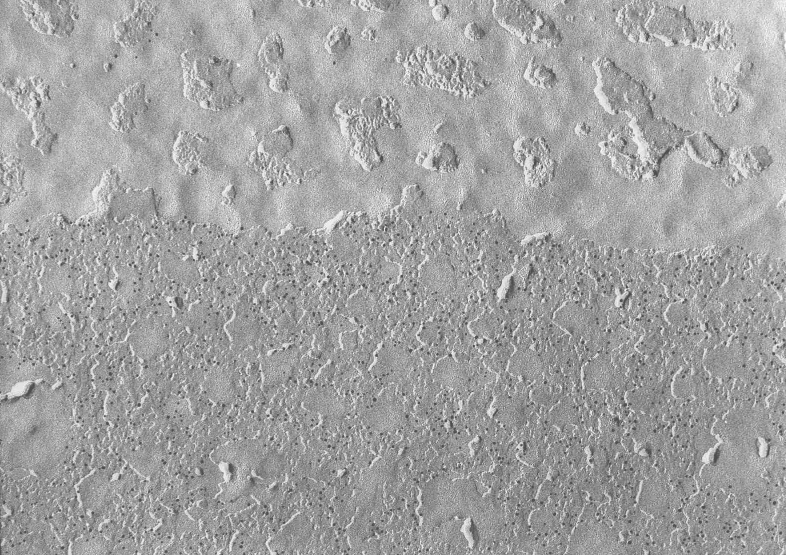
The interior of a sheep lens cell plasma membrane. The smooth areas mainly at the top of the picture are mainly lipid membrane. The rough areas correlate to areas of protein in the membrane. When viewed closely the freeze-fracture replica immunolabling (FRIL) reveals the gold beads averaging 5nm in size coated in anti-Cxn46 antibodies. They pepper the visible portion of the gap junction containing the protein.

Freeze-fracture was the only method to give a planar view of the membrane interior, so some effort was needed to establish which aspects of a membrane interior image were biologically original and which were produced by the freezing, fracturing, and replication processes. Additional freeze-fracture techniques established adequate explanations as to why the two fracture halves were not always complementary and why the fracture plane only sometimes went between the lipid bilayer. By 1989, a further modification of the basic freeze-fracture technique called freeze-fracture replica immunolabelling (FRIL) helped to identify "bumps" in the membrane as intramembrane protein particles.
