= Immunoradiometric assay =

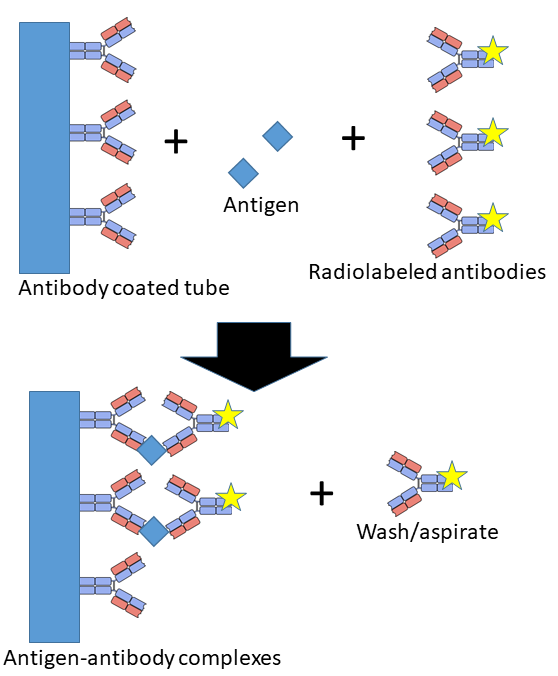

Immunoradiometric assay (IRMA) is a type of immunoassay in which an antibody is labelled with a radioisotope and used to measure an antigen in a sample. Unlike conventional radioimmunoassay (RIA), which is generally a competitive assay using radiolabelled antigen, IRMA is a noncompetitive assay in which the amount of bound radioactive antibody increases with the concentration of the analyte.

== History ==
The immunoradiometric assay was introduced by L. E. M. Miles and C. N. Hales in 1968. In a paper published in Nature, they described the use of labelled antibodies in immunological assay systems and discussed the potential for improved sensitivity and precision. Later that year, Miles and Hales reported an immunoradiometric assay for human growth hormone.

Subsequent developments included two-site, or "sandwich", IRMA methods, in which an antigen is bound between a solid-phase capture antibody and a radiolabelled detection antibody.

== Principle ==
In a conventional IRMA, purified antibodies labelled with a radioisotope are allowed to react with antigen in the sample. The antigen–antibody complex is then separated from excess unbound labelled antibody, and the radioactivity associated with the bound fraction is measured. The amount of bound radioactivity is directly related to the concentration of antigen in the sample.

In the original form of IRMA, excess labelled antibody can be removed by reaction with antigen attached to a solid phase. In the two-site IRMA, the analyte is first captured by an immobilized antibody and then detected with a second, radiolabelled antibody that recognizes another epitope on the same antigen. The resulting antibody–antigen–antibody complex forms the basis of the "sandwich" assay.

Radioisotopes used as antibody labels have commonly included iodine-125, because the emitted radiation can be measured at very low concentrations.

== Advantages and limitations ==
Two-site IRMAs can provide greater sensitivity and specificity than traditional competitive radioimmunoassays because two antibodies can recognize separate antigenic sites and because the assay operates under reagent-excess rather than competitive conditions.

Potential limitations include nonspecific binding, interference from serum proteins or antibodies, the need to separate bound and unbound labelled reagents, and the consumption of relatively large amounts of antibody. At very high antigen concentrations, two-site IRMAs may also show a paradoxical reduction in signal known as the high-dose hook effect, which can cause falsely low results.
