= Vascular corrosion casting =

Resin casting of the 3D structure of blood vessels

Vascular corrosion casting uses resin to capture the 3D structure of blood vessels within human and animal tissue. It is widely used in research as a technique for obtaining the volume and surface area of the blood vessel network within an organ. The earliest known use of corrosion casting was by Robert Boyle in 1663.

== Technique ==
Vascular corrosion casting requires the use of a solidifying material such as a resin. The most common resin used for vascular corrosion casting is Batson's 17. The process begins with the draining of blood from vessels to prevent blockage from clotting, this can be achieved by perfusing blood vessels with a physiological fluid such as phosphate buffered saline. Subsequently, the blood vessels of interest are filled with resin (or alternative solidifying material). The resin is allowed to cure resulting in the blood vessel network containing a solid plastic material. Surrounding tissue is dissolved away using a corrosive chemical, commonly potassium hydroxide. Corrosion should not affect the resin, only dissolving tissue. The final product is a 3D network of blood vessels.

=== Vinyl ===
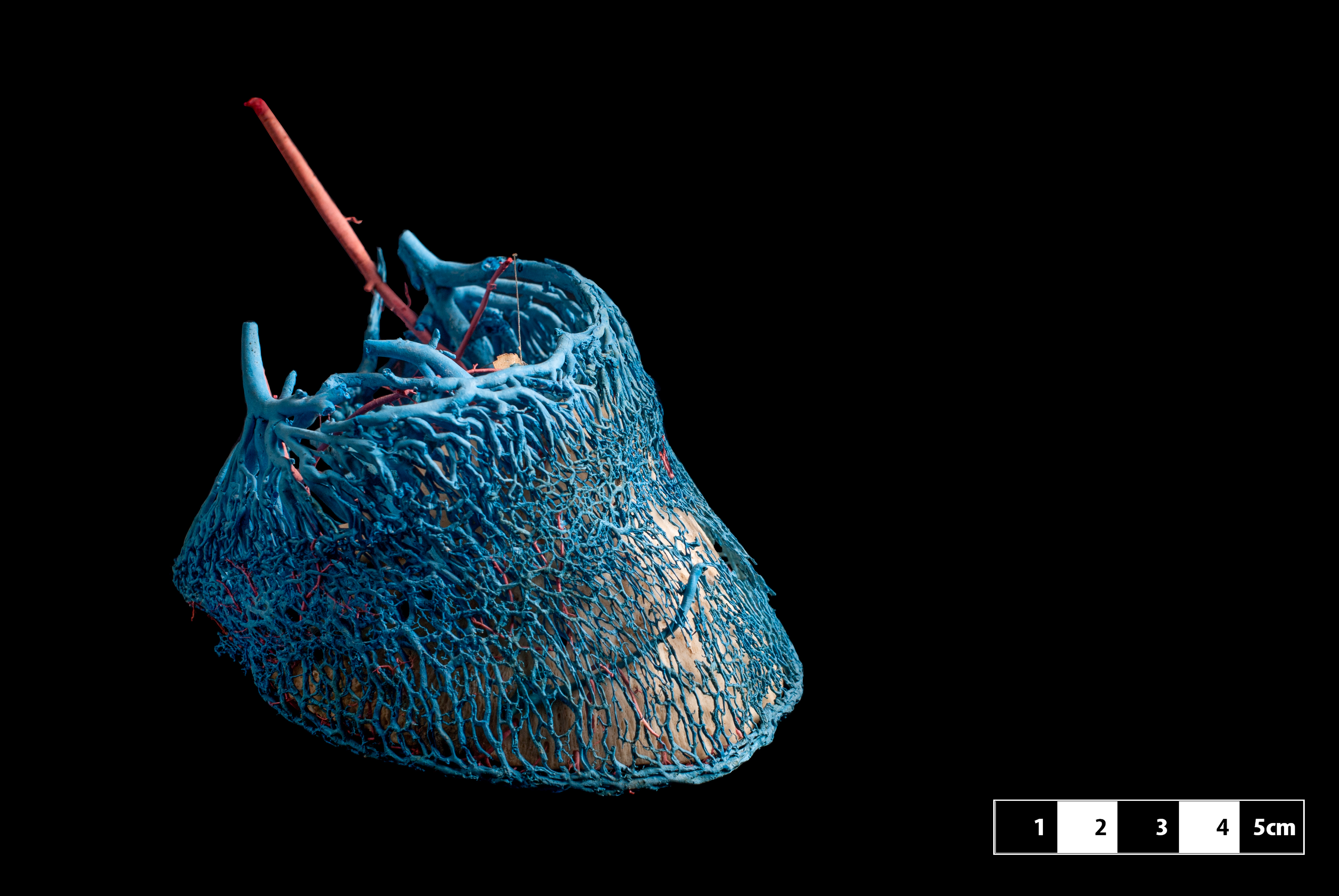
Equine foot where the vinyl technique was applied followed by corrosion.

The technique of injecting vinyl acetate followed by corrosion, besides having low cost, provides a long period of conservation, satisfying the need of undergraduate students as the study of anatomy. This is used to mark the circulatory system (arterial and venous) with the use of pre-pigmented vinyl acetate to fill the vessels of the part to be studied in order to be able to visualize the ducts and duly filled systems. For corrosion or semi-corrosion, hydrochloric acid is the most viable substance used to obtain templates for the vascularization of organs or parts.

== Gallery ==
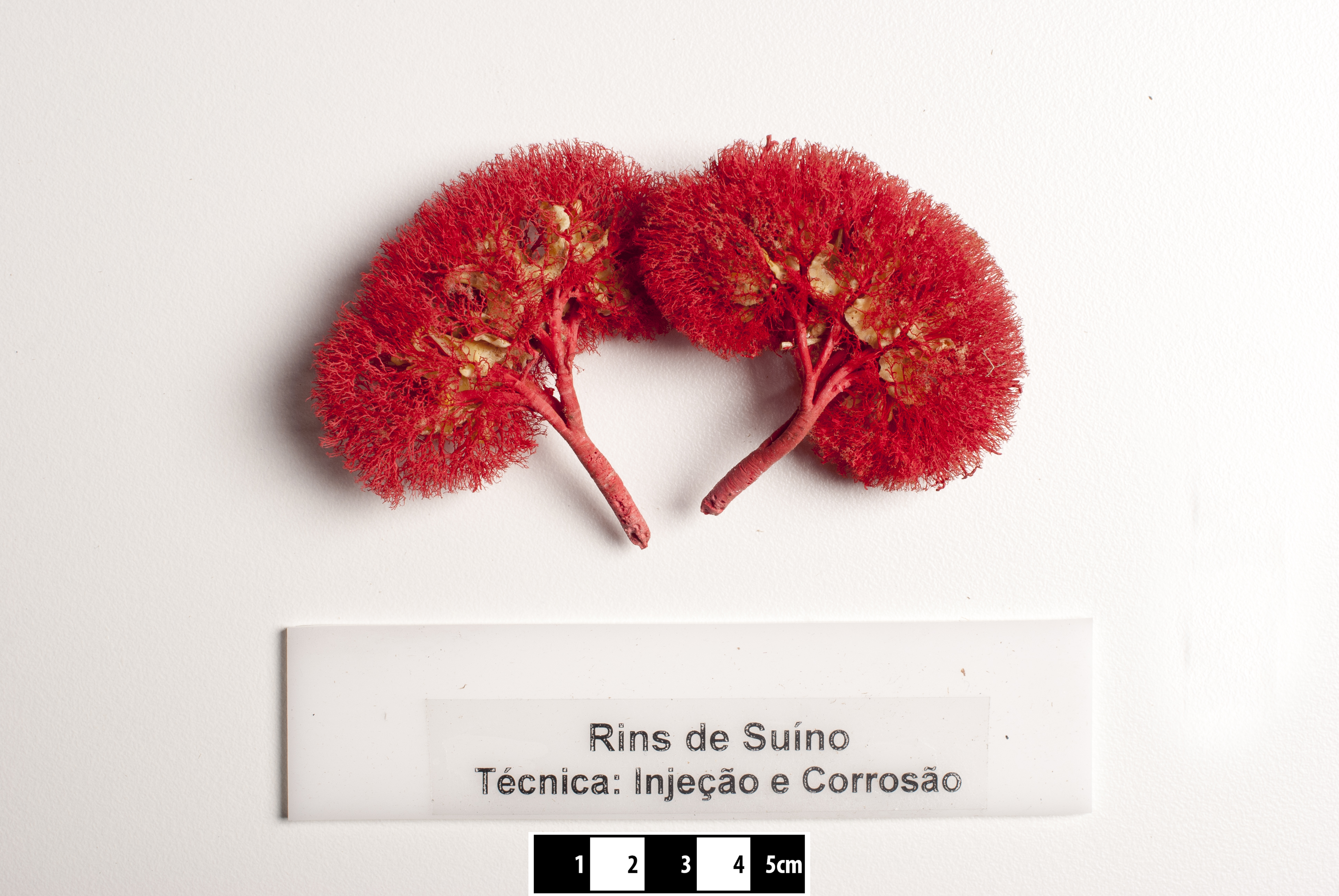
Domestic pig kidneys.

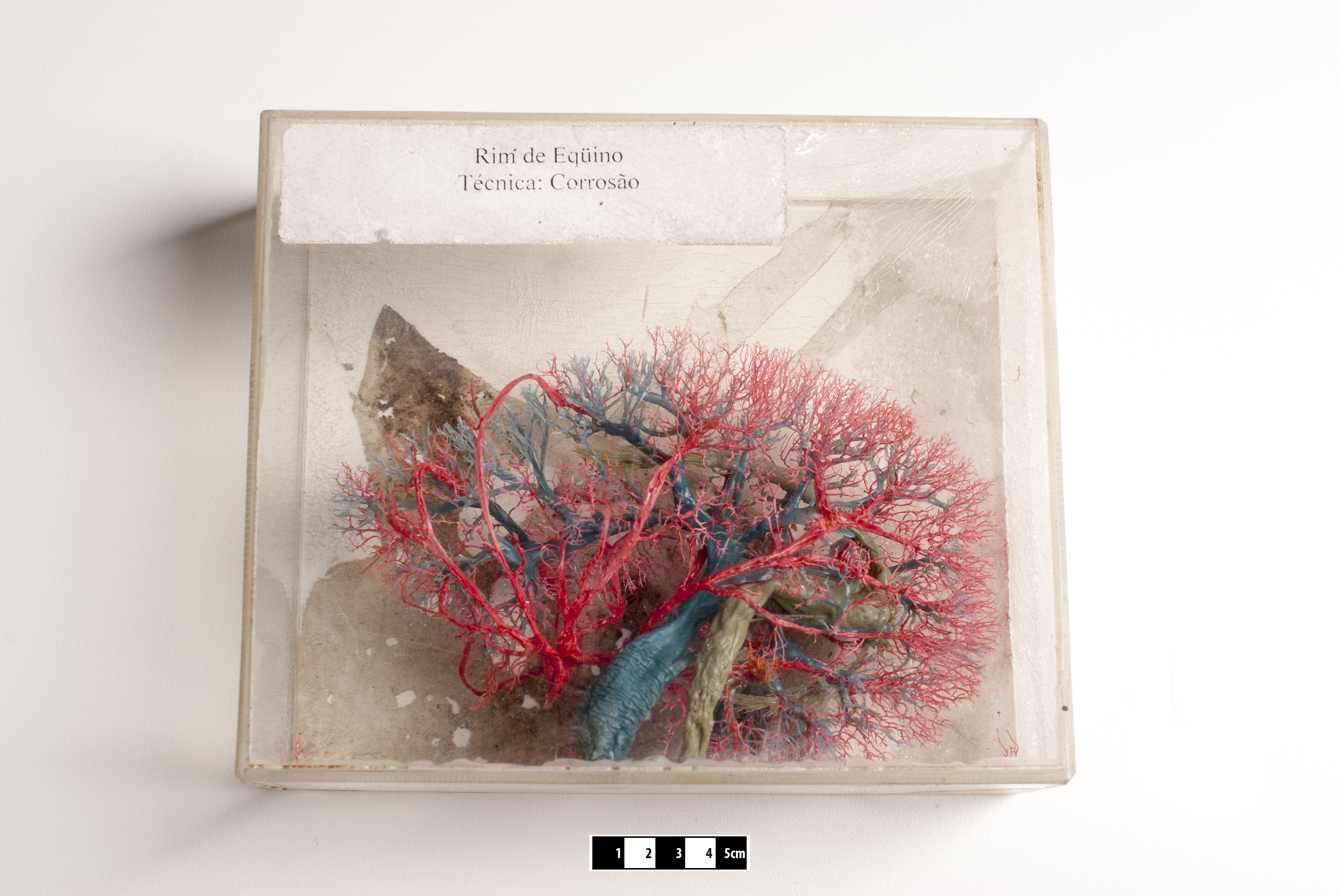
Equine kidney.

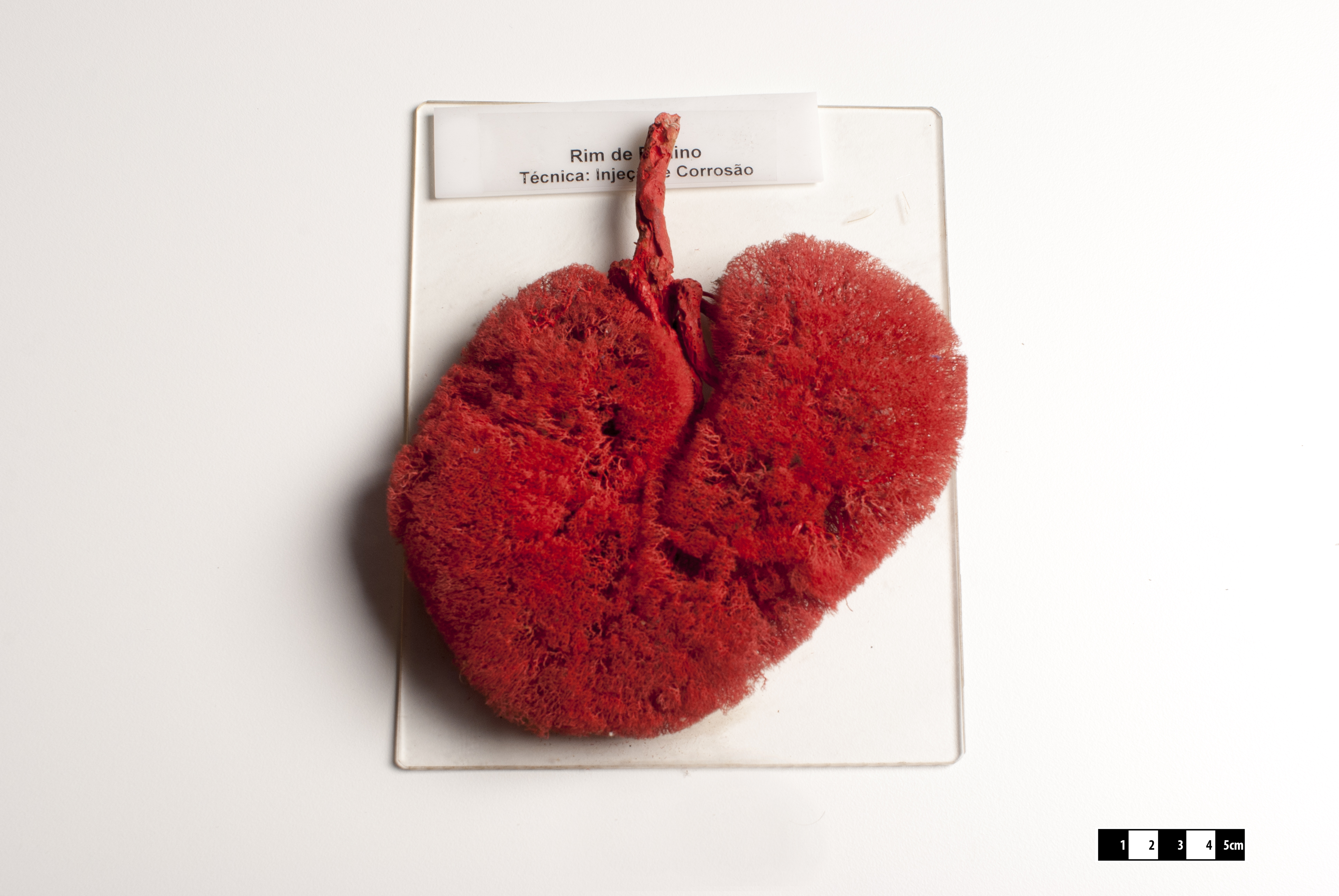
Bovine kidney.

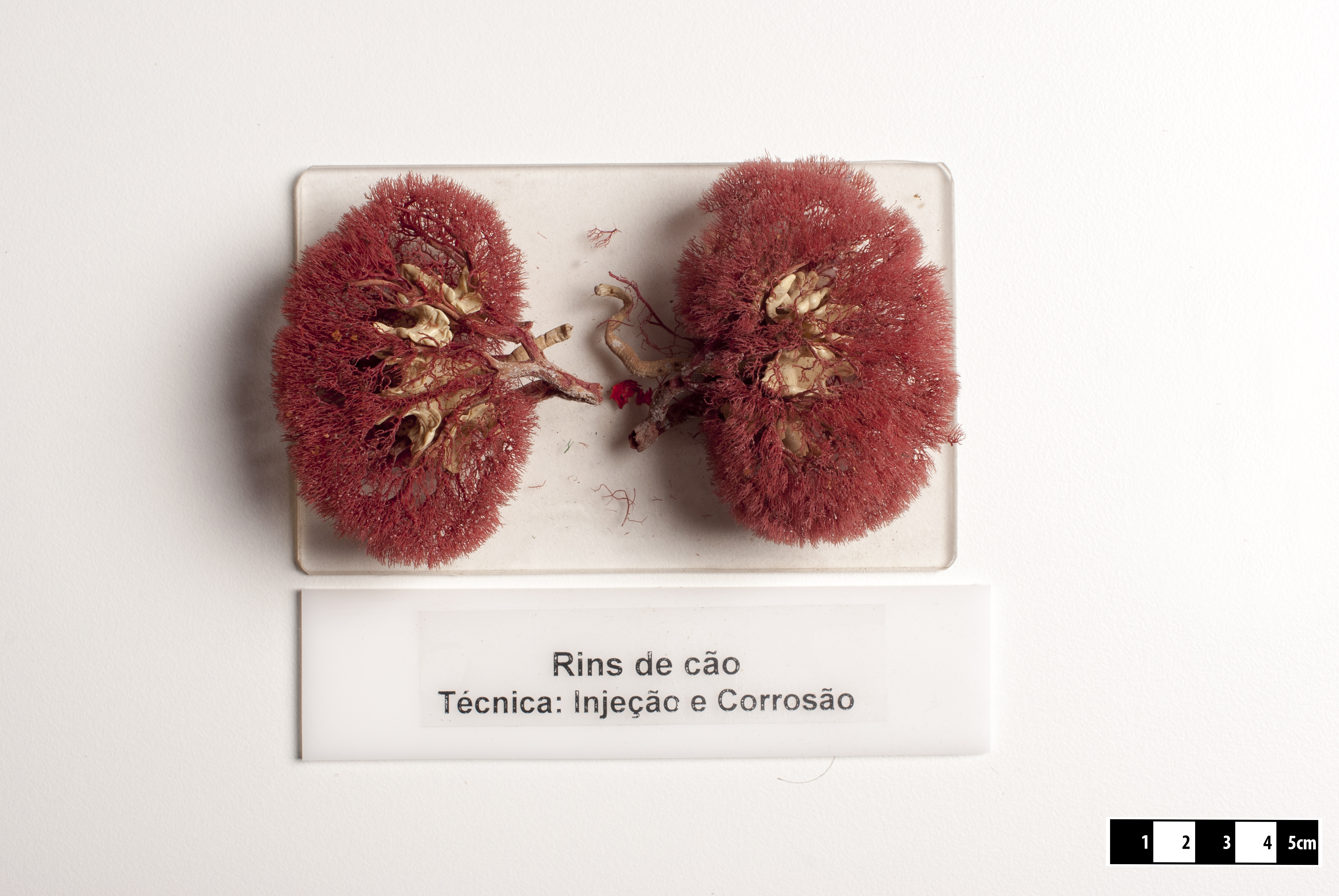
Dog kidneys.

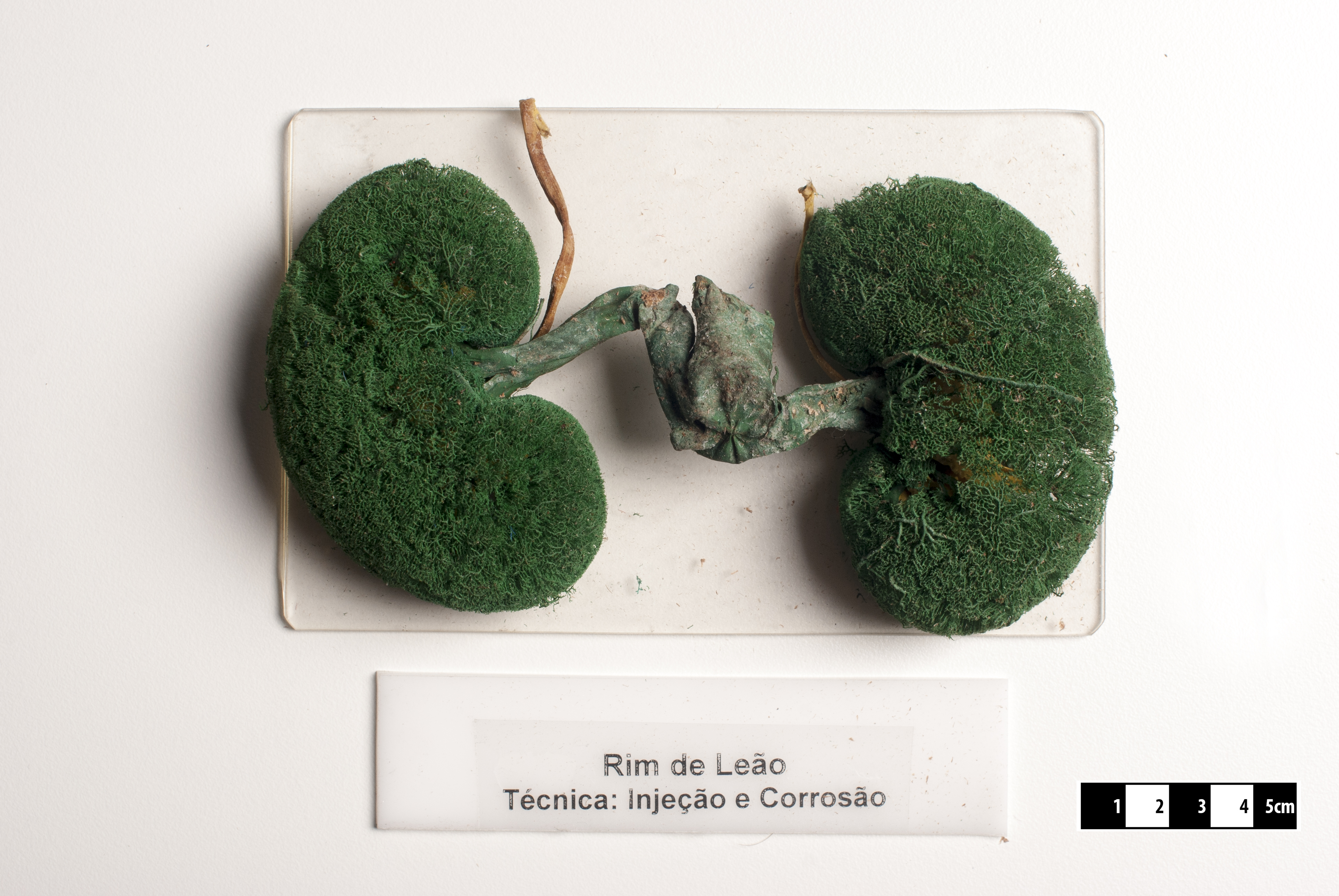
Lion kidneys.

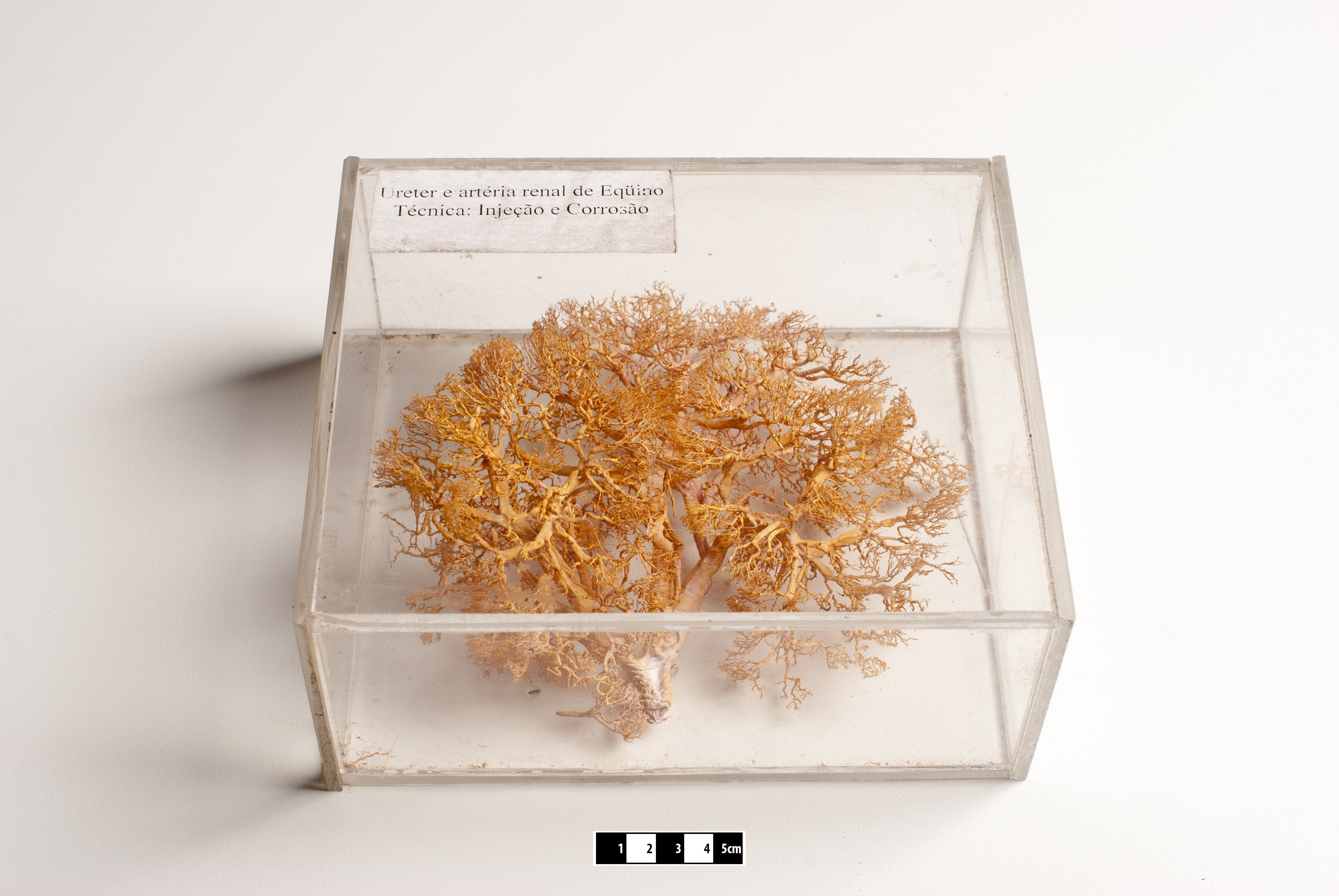
Equine kidney.
