= Skin window technique =

Technique to study cell migration

- Purpose: identify immune response

Skin window technique is used in immunology where the top layer of skin is scraped off making it possible to identify the immune response that would occur with a diminished physical barrier in the host, and observe mobilization of leukocytes.

It was developed by John Rebuck in 1955.
