= Ultramicrotomy =

Ultrafine specimen slicing technique

Ultramicrotomy is a method for cutting specimens into extremely thin slices, called ultra-thin sections, that can be studied and documented at different magnifications in an electron microscope such as a transmission electron microscope (TEM). It is used mostly for biological specimens, but sections of plastics and soft metals can also be prepared. For example, recently ultramicrotomy was used to make 2D material devices and use it for DNA sensing. The biological sections must be very thin because the 50 to 125 kV electrons of the standard electron microscope cannot pass through biological material much thicker than 150 nm. For best resolutions, sections should be from 30 to 60 nm. This is roughly the equivalent to splitting a 0.1 mm-thick human hair into 2,000 slices along its diameter, or cutting a single red blood cell into 100 slices.

== Ultramicrotomy process ==
Ultra-thin sections of specimens are cut using a specialized instrument called an "ultramicrotome". The ultramicrotome is fitted with either a diamond knife, for most biological ultra-thin sectioning, or a glass knife, often used for initial cuts. There are numerous other pieces of equipment involved in the ultramicrotomy process. Before selecting an area of the specimen block to be ultra-thin sectioned, the technician examines semithin or "thick" sections range from 0.5 to 2μm. These thick sections are also known as survey sections and are viewed under a light microscope to determine whether the right area of the specimen is in a position for thin sectioning. "Ultra-thin" sections from 50 to 100 nm thick are able to be viewed in the TEM.

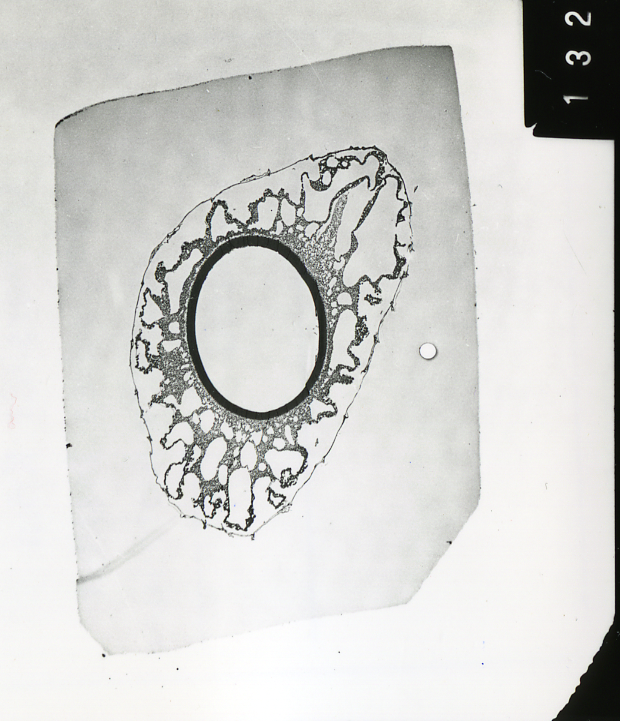
Low magnification of an ultra-thin section (length = 0.5 mm) of a megaspore of Salvinia cucullata (intermediate lens micrograph taken with the ZEISS TEM 9A – "flying carpet" preparation)

Tissue sections obtained by ultramicrotomy are compressed by the cutting force of the knife. In addition, interference microscopy of the cut surface of the blocks reveals that the sections are often not flat. With Epon or Vestopal as embedding medium the ridges and valleys usually do not exceed 0.5 μm in height, i.e., 5–10 times the thickness of ordinary sections (1).

A small sample is taken from the specimen to be investigated. Specimens may be from biological matter, like animal or plant tissue, or from inorganic material such as rock, metal, magnetic tape, plastic, film, etc. The sample block is first trimmed to create a block face 1 mm by 1 mm in size. "Thick" sections (1 μm) are taken to be looked at on an optical microscope. An area is chosen to be sectioned for TEM and the block face is re-trimmed to a size no larger than 0.7 mm on a side. Block faces usually have a square, trapezoidal, rectangular, or triangular shape. Finally, thin sections are cut with a glass or diamond knife using an ultramicrotome and the sections are left floating on water that is held in a boat or trough. The sections are then retrieved from the water surface and mounted on a copper, nickel, gold, or other metal grid. Ideal section thickness for transmission electron microscopy with accelerating voltages between 50kV and 120kV is about 30–100 nm.

== Variants for SEM ==
Scanning electron microscopy (SEM) does not require the specimen to be thin enough for the electron to pass through. As a result, it allows the use of thicker slices (although this reduces resolution, it makes imaging of thicker specimen more achievable) or even the use of an entire block of material. A precise diamond knife is still required to generate the slices.

- Array tomography works on a block of fixed, dehydrated sample embedded into a solid material (usually a resin). A specialized ultramicrotome cuts a slice and immediately sticks it onto a ribbon, turning the block into a series of slices-on-ribbons. The ribbons are arranged into an array and imaged with SEM in a single go. The obtained image is divided to obtain images for individual slices.
- Serial block-face imaging or serial block face SEM puts a diamond knife in the SEM chamber. The same sort of fixed, embedded sample is required. After the SEM is finished with imaging one section, the knife removes the top layer to reveal another section.

The images of sections can be combined into a volume, making these two forms of volume electron microscopy.

== Advances ==
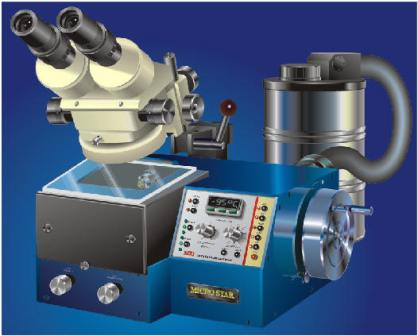
Cryoultramicrotomy

In 1952 Humberto Fernandez Morán introduced cryoultramicrotomy, which is a similar technique but done at freezing temperatures between −20 and −150 °C. Cryoultramicrotomy can be used to cut ultra-thin frozen biological specimens. One of the advantages over the more "traditional" ultramicrotomy process is speed, since it should be possible to freeze and section a specimen in 1 to 2 hours.
