= Gingival disease =

- Specialty: Dentistry

Gingival disease is a term used to group the diseases that affect the gingiva (gums). The most common gingival disease is gingivitis, the earliest stage of gingival-related diseases. Gingival disease encompasses all the conditions surrounding the gums; this includes plaque-induced gingivitis, non-dental biofilm plaque-induced gingivitis, and periodontal diseases.

== Types ==
Gingival health that is not well cared for is usually connected with inflammation of the gums. This leads to gingivitis, which is linked to two categories:

- Dental plaque biofilm-induced gingivitis
- Non-dental-plaque-induced gingival disease

Dental plaque biofilm-induced gingivitis is often called "localized inflammation initiated by microbial biofilm accumulation on teeth". Non-dental-plaque-induced gingival diseases are the most uncommon bacterial infections of the gingiva. Here is each category classification based on the Classification of Periodontal Diseases and Conditions in 2017:

Gingival Classifications

- Dental plaque biofilm-induced
  1. Associated with dental biofilm alone
  2. Mediated by systemic or local risk factors
  3. Drug-influenced gingival enlargement
- Non-dental-plaque-induced
  1. Genetic/ developmental disorders
  2. Specific infections
  3. Inflammatory and immune conditions
  4. Reactive processes
  5. Neoplasms
  6. Endocrine, nutritional, and metabolic diseases
  7. Traumatic lesions
  8. Gingival pigmentation

As gingivitis progresses further and is not treated, it may progress into periodontitis. Periodontal disease is when the gums surrounding the teeth become swollen, causing the surrounding plaque to build up. Left untreated, it can cause the teeth to become loose due to weak gums. Periodontal disease can compromise factors such as:

- Gingiva
- Periodontal ligament
- Dental cement
- Alveolar bone

== Causes ==
Dental plaque accumulates at the surfaces when proper cleaning and maintenance are not done. There is inflammation due to the bacteria released from the toxins. Calculus forms, and if not removed, causes this disease. In most cases, the cause of gingival diseases such as gingivitis is due to poor oral hygiene. This is the most common cause of gingival diseases. Though other factors included are:

- Smoking
- Diabetes
- Female hormonal change
- Cancer treatment
- Epilepsy drugs

== Treatment/Preventatives ==
The condition must be treated by professional dental care when left untreated for too long. Though gingival diseases can be easily prevented with good daily oral maintenance. The ADA recommends five preventatives that are essential to supporting healthy oral health:

1. Brush teeth twice daily with an ADA-recommended fluoride toothpaste for 2 minutes
2. Replace toothbrush every 3–4 months
3. Floss at least once every day
4. Maintain a healthy diet; less sugar intake
5. Pursue dental care twice annually

Speaking to a pharmacist helps remind or mention problems seen in oral care. ADA encourages those who seek help to reach out to local pharmacies, which can help identify signs of gingival diseases and provide products and advice for oral health.
