= Precision attachment =

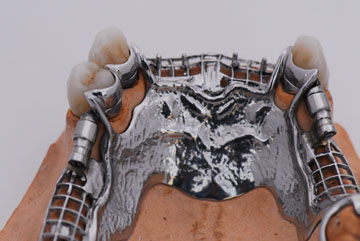
Dental bridge fixed to upper jaw using precision attachment

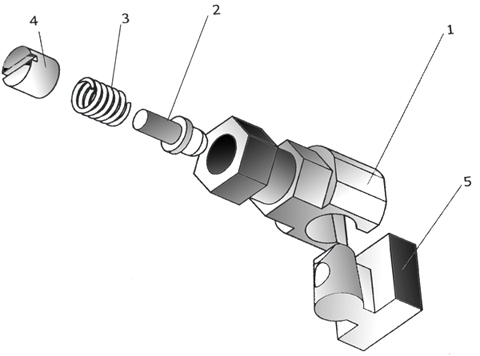
Parts of the precision attachment

Precision attachments

In restorative dentistry, precision attachments are the functional mechanical parts of the removable partial denture made of plastic, metal or a combination of both. They consist of two parts referred as the 'male' part that is fixed to a crown inside the patient's mouth and a 'female' part which holds the partial denture.

The patient can insert and remove the partial dentures and the aim of the precision attachment is to give the patient maximum comfort and ease while wearing, inserting or removing.
