= Heteroduplex analysis =

Method in biochemistry to detect point mutations

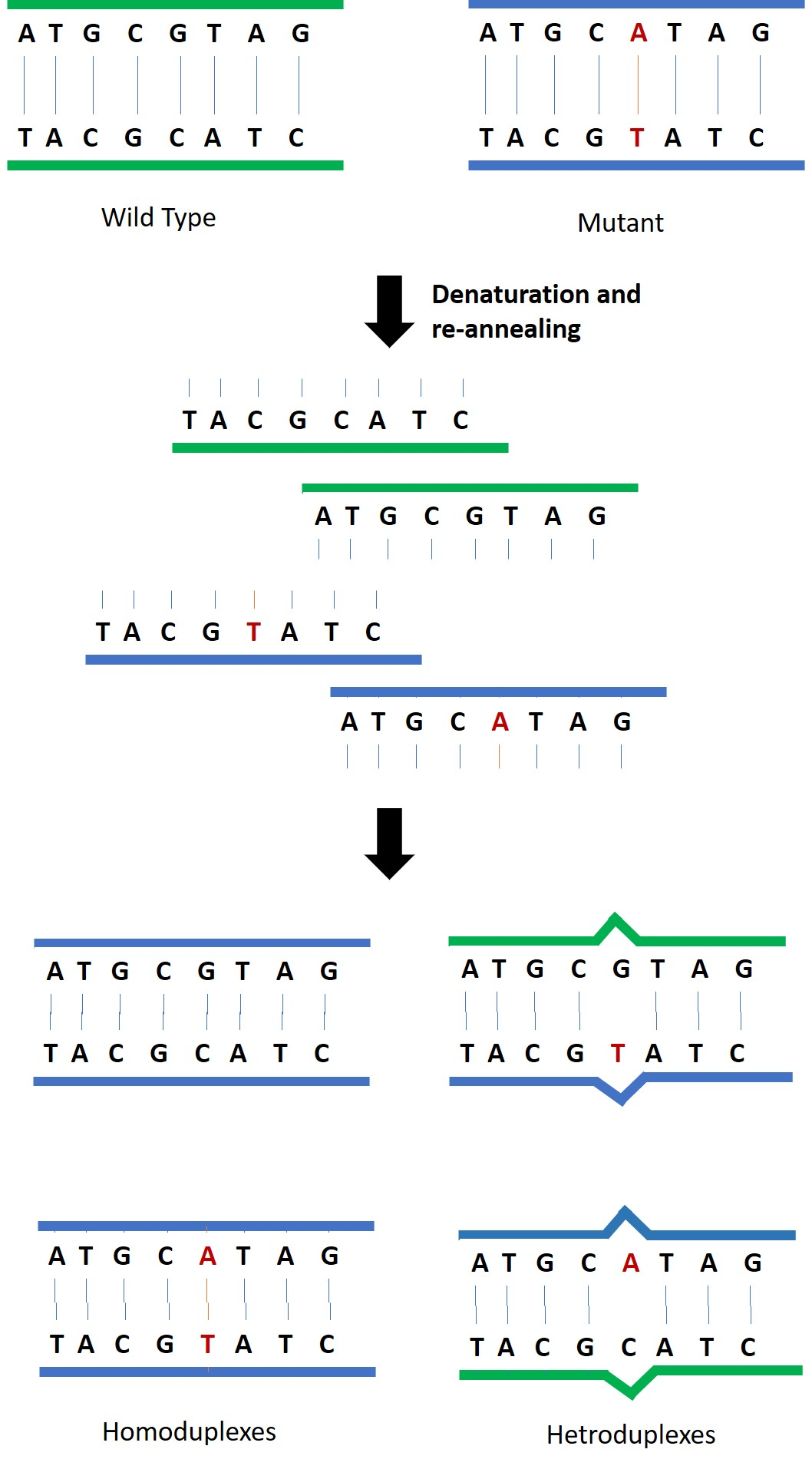
Heteroduplexes and homoduplexes formed after amplification and re-annealing of wild type and mutant alleles

Heteroduplex analysis (HDA) is a method in biochemistry used to detect point mutations in DNA (Deoxyribonucleic acid) since 1992. Heteroduplexes are dsDNA molecules that have one or more mismatched pairs, on the other hand homoduplexes are dsDNA which are perfectly paired. This method of analysis depend up on the fact that heteroduplexes shows reduced mobility relative to the homoduplex DNA. heteroduplexes are formed between different DNA alleles. In a mixture of wild-type and mutant amplified DNA, heteroduplexes are formed in mutant alleles and homoduplexes are formed in wild-type alleles. There are two types of heteroduplexes based on type and extent of mutation in the DNA. Small deletions or insertion create bulge-type heteroduplexes which is stable and is verified by electron microscope. Single base substitutions creates more unstable heteroduplexes called bubble-type heteroduplexes, because of low stability it is difficult to visualize in electron microscopy. HDA is widely used for rapid screening of mutation of the 3 bp p.F508del deletion in the CFTR gene.
