= Fluorescence polarization immunoassay =

Class of invitro biochemical test

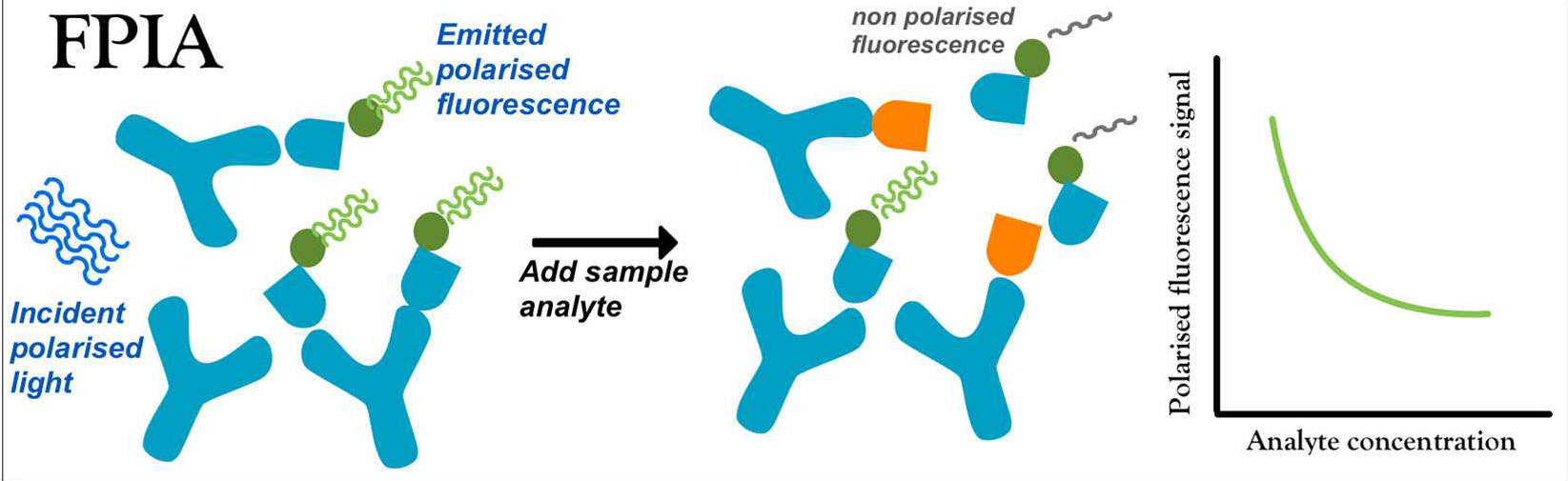

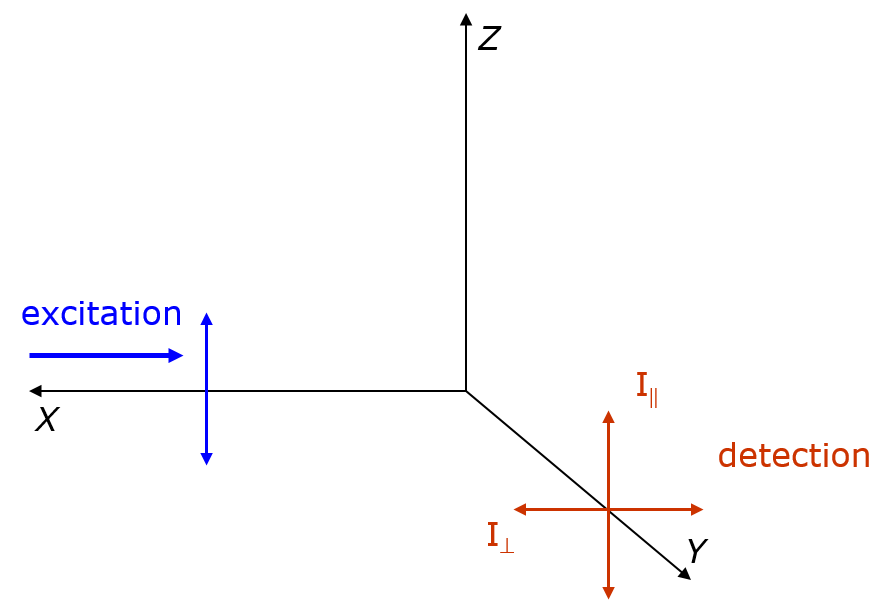
Fluorescence Polarization/Anisotropy Three Dimensional Diagram of the Theory

Fluorescence polarization immunoassay (FPIA) is a class of in vitro biochemical test used for rapid detection of antibody or antigen in sample. FPIA is a competitive homogenous assay, that consists of a simple prepare and read method, without the requirement of separation or washing steps.

The basis of the assay is fluorescence anisotropy, also known as fluorescence polarization. If a fluorescent molecule is stationary and exposed to plane-polarized light, it will become excited and consequently emit radiation back to the polarized-plane. However, if the excited fluorescent molecule is in motion (rotational or translational) during the fluorescent lifetime, it will emit light in a different direction than the excitation plane. The fluorescent lifetime is the amount of time between the absorption moment and the fluorescent emission moment.

Typically, the rate at which a molecule rotates is indicative of its size. When a fluorescent-labelled molecule (tracer) binds to another molecule the rotational motion will change, resulting in an altered intensity of plane-polarized light, which results in altered fluorescence polarization. Fluorescence polarization immunoassays employ a fluorophore bound antigen that when bound to the antibody of interest, will increase fluorescence polarization. The change in polarization is proportional to the amount of antigen in sample, and is measured by a fluorescence polarization analyzer.

== History ==
Fluorescence polarization was first observed by F. Weigert in 1920. He experimented with solutions of fluorescein, eosin, and other dyes at various temperatures and viscosities. Observing that polarization increased with viscosity of the solvent and the size of the dye molecule, but decreased with an increase in temperature, he deduced that polarization increased with a decrease in mobility of the emitting species. From 1925 to 1926 Francis Perrin detailed a quantitative theory for fluorescence polarization in multiple significant publications which remain relevant to this day.

Since Perrin's contribution, the technique has grown from determining binding isotherms under heavily controlled parameters, to the study of antigen-antibody, small molecule-protein, and hormone-receptor binding interactions. A fluorescence polarization immunoassay was first described and used in the 1960s. The competitive homogenous characteristic allowed for the fluorescence polarization immunoassay to be automated much easier than other immunoassay techniques such as radioimmunoassays or enzyme-linked immunoassays.

Despite originating as a method for direct interaction studies, the technique has been adopted by high-throughput screening (HTS) since the mid 1990s to help facilitate the drug discovery process by studying complex enzymatic interaction.

Competitive homogeneous immunoassay

== Principle ==
FPIA quantifies the change in fluorescence polarization of reaction mixtures of fluorescent-labelled tracer, sample antigen, and defined antibody. Operating under fixed temperature and viscosity allows for the fluorescence polarization to be directly proportional to the size of the fluorophore. Free tracer in solution has a lower fluorescence polarization than antibody-bound tracer with slower Brownian motion. The tracer and the specific antigen will compete to bind to the antibody and if the antigen is low in concentration, more tracer will be bound to the antibody resulting in a higher fluorescence polarization and vice versa.

A conventional FPIA follows the procedure below:

1. A specific quantity of sample is added to reaction buffer.
2. The solution is allowed to equilibrate at room temperature for approximately two minutes.
3. The solution is evaluated in a fluorescence polarization analyzer to gather a baseline measurement.
4. A specific quantity of antigen conjugated with fluorophore is added to the solution.
5. The solution again equilibrates for approximately two minutes.
6. The solution is evaluated again by the fluorescence polarization analyzer.
7. The fluorescence polarization value for the tracer containing solution is compared to the baseline and magnitude of difference is proportional to quantity of target analyte in sample.

== Applications ==
FPIA has emerged as a viable technique for quantification of small molecules in mixtures, including: pesticides, mycotoxins in food, pharmaceutical compounds in wastewater, metabolites in urine and serum indicative of drug use (cannabinoids, amphetamines, barbiturates, cocaine, benzodiazepines, methadone, opiates, and PCP), and various small molecule toxins. As well as with the analysis of hormone-receptor interactions.

== See also ==
- ELISA
- Radio immunoassay
- FRET
- Magnetic immunoassay
- Fluorescence
- Immunoscreening
- Lateral flow test
- Cloned enzyme donor immunoassay
- Surround optical fiber immunoassay
- Plate reader
