= Therapeutic drug monitoring =

Study of medicines and blood

Therapeutic drug monitoring (TDM) is a branch of clinical chemistry and clinical pharmacology that specializes in the measurement of medication levels in blood. Its main focus is on drugs with a narrow therapeutic range, i.e. drugs that can easily be under- or overdosed. TDM aimed at improving patient care by individually adjusting the dose of drugs for which clinical experience or clinical trials have shown it improved outcome in the general or special populations. It can be based on an a priori pharmacogenetic, demographic and clinical information, and/or on the a posteriori measurement of blood concentrations of drugs (pharmacokinetic monitoring) or biological surrogate or end-point markers of effect (pharmacodynamic monitoring).

There are numerous variables that influence the interpretation of drug concentration data: time, route and dose of drug given, time of blood sampling, handling and storage conditions, precision and accuracy of the analytical method, validity of pharmacokinetic models and assumptions, co-medications and, last but not least, clinical status of the patient (i.e. disease, renal/hepatic status, biologic tolerance to drug therapy, etc.).

Many different professionals (physicians, clinical pharmacists, nurses, medical laboratory scientists, etc.) are involved with the various elements of drug concentration monitoring, which is a truly multidisciplinary process. Because failure to properly carry out any one of the components can severely affect the usefulness of using drug concentrations to optimize therapy, an organized approach to the overall process is critical.

== A priori therapeutic drug monitoring ==
A priori TDM consists of determining the initial dose regimen to be given to a patient, based on clinical endpoint and on established population pharmacokinetic–pharmacodynamic (PK/PD) relationships. These relationships help to identify sub-populations of patients with different dosage requirements, by utilizing demographic data, clinical findings, clinical chemistry results, and/or, when appropriate, pharmacogenetic characteristics.

== A posteriori therapeutic drug monitoring ==
The concept of a posteriori TDM corresponds to the usual meaning of TDM in medical practice, which refers to the readjustment of the dosage of a given treatment in response to the measurement of an appropriate marker of drug exposure or effect. TDM encompasses all aspects of this feedback control, namely:

- it includes pre-analytical, analytical and post-analytical phases, each with the same importance;
- it is most often based on the specific, accurate, precise and timely determinations of the active and.or toxic forms of drugs in biological samples collected at the appropriate times in the correct containers (PK monitoring), or can employ the measurement of a biological perimeter as a surrogate or end-point marker of effect (PD monitoring) e.g. concentration of an endogenous compound, enzymatic activity, gene expression, etc. either as a complement to PK monitoring or as the main TDM tool;
- it requires interpretation of the results, taking into account pre-analytical conditions, clinical information and the clinical efficiency of the current dosage regimen; this can be achieved by the application of PK-PD modeling;
- it can potentially benefit from population PK/PD models possibly combined with individual pharmacokinetic forecasting techniques, or pharmacogenetic data.

== Characteristics of drugs candidate to therapeutic drug monitoring ==
In pharmacotherapy, many medications are used without monitoring of blood levels, as their dosage can generally be varied according to the clinical response that a patient gets to that substance. For certain drugs, this is impracticable, while insufficient levels will lead to undertreatment or resistance, and excessive levels can lead to toxicity and tissue damage.

Indications in favor of therapeutic drug monitoring include:

- consistent, clinically established pharmacodynamic relationships between plasma drug concentrations and pharmacological efficacy and/or toxicity;
- significant between-patient pharmacokinetic variability, making a standard dosage achieve different concentration levels among patients (while the drug disposition remains relatively stable in a given patient);
- narrow therapeutic window of the drug, which forbids giving high doses in all patients to ensure overall efficacy;
- drug dosage optimization not achievable based on clinical observation alone;
- duration of the treatment and criticality for patient's condition justifying dosage adjustment efforts;
- potential patient compliance problems that might be remedied through concentration monitoring.

TDM determinations are also used to detect and diagnose poisoning with drugs, should the suspicion arise.

Examples of drugs widely analysed for therapeutic drug monitoring:

- Aminoglycoside antibiotics (gentamicin)
- Antiepileptics (such as carbamazepine, phenytoin and valproic acid)
- Mood stabilisers, especially lithium citrate
- Antipsychotics (such as pimozide and clozapine)
- Digoxin
- Ciclosporin, tacrolimus in organ transplant recipients

TDM increasingly proposed for a number of therapeutic drugs, e.g. many antibiotics, small molecule tyrosine kinase inhibitors and other targeted anticancer agents, TNF inhibitors and other biological agents, antifungal agents, antiretroviral agents used in HIV infection, psychiatric drugs etc.

== Practice of therapeutic drug monitoring ==
Automated analytical methods such as enzyme multiplied immunoassay technique or fluorescence polarization immunoassay are widely available in medical laboratories for drugs frequently measured in practice. Nowadays, most other drugs can be readily measured in blood or plasma using versatile methods such as liquid chromatography–mass spectrometry or gas chromatography–mass spectrometry, which progressively replaced high-performance liquid chromatography. Yet, TDM is not limited to the provision of precise and accurate concentration measurement results, it also involves appropriate medical interpretation, based on robust scientific knowledge.

In order to guarantee the quality of this clinical interpretation, it is essential that the sample be taken under good conditions: i.e., preferably under a stable dosage, at a standardized sampling time (often at the end of a dosing interval), excluding any source of bias (sample contamination or dilution, analytical interferences) and having carefully recorded the sampling time, the last dose intake time, the current dosage and the influential patient's characteristics.

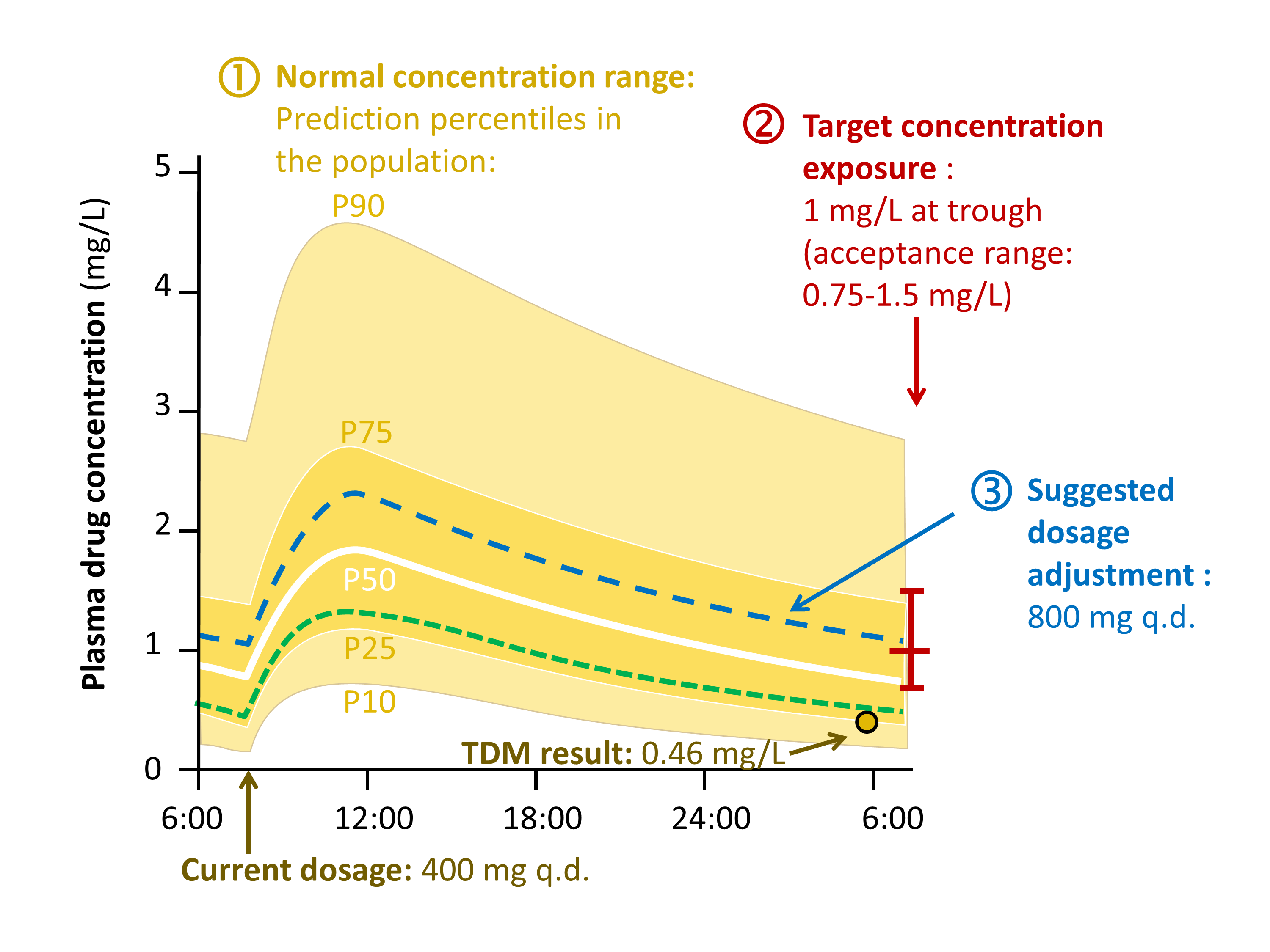
TDM interpretation: an anticancer drug is given to a patient at a dosage of 400 mg every day at 8:00 am. A TDM sample is obtained at 6:00 am, showing a drug concentration of 0.46 mg/L. 1) Regarding “normality”, the result is around the 25th percentile, suggesting a rather high drug clearance in this patient. 2) Regarding “appropriateness”, the result suggests that the patient's most likely concentration curve (green dashed line) passes below the acceptance range of 0.75 to 1.5 mg/L at trough, raising concerns about treatment efficacy. 3) Regarding dosage adjustment to recommend, this TDM result suggests that a doubled dose of 800 mg daily might be suitable to drive the concentration curve close to target (blue dotted line). Note that this interpretation assumes that the patient's adherence to prescription is good, and that the sample measurement is accurate.

The interpretation of a drug concentration result goes through the following stages:

1. Determine whether the observed concentration is in the normal range expected under the dosage administered, taking into account the patient's individual characteristics. This requires referring to population pharmacokinetic studies of the drug in consideration.
2. Determine whether the patient's concentration profile is close to the exposure target associated with the best trade-off between probability of therapeutic success and risk of toxicity. This refers to clinical pharmacodynamic knowledge describing dose-concentration-response relationships among treated patients.
3. If the observed concentration is plausible but far from the suitable level, determine how to adjust the dosage to drive the concentration curve close to target. Several approaches exist for this, from the easiest “rule of three” to sophisticated computer-assisted calculations implementing Bayesian inference algorithms based on population pharmacokinetics.

Ideally, the usefulness of a TDM strategy should be confirmed through an evidence-based approach involving the performance of well-designed controlled clinical trials. In practice however, TDM has undergone formal clinical evaluation only for a limited number of drugs to date, and much of its development rests on empirical foundations.

Point-of-care tests for an easy performance of TDM at the medical practice are under elaboration.

== Integration with precision medicine ==
Integrating improved pharmacometrics, along with model-informed precision dosing (MIPD), can further refine therapeutic drug monitoring to provide more precisely personalized treatments. Data from these approaches can be integrated into the electronic patient record in the form of clinical decision support systems (CDSSs), providing improved information to clinicians and caregivers.
