= CD/DVD based immunoassay =

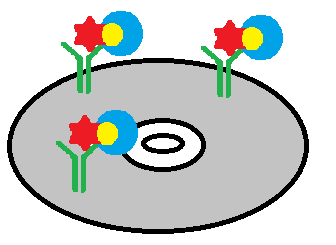
Illustration of the basic componenets of a CD/DVD based immunoassay, which includes the disk (grey), a probe (green), gold nanoparticle (red), analyte (yellow), and silver particle (blue)

A compact disk/digital versatile disk (CD/DVD) based immunoassay is a method for determining the concentration of a compound in research and diagnostic laboratories by performing the test on an adapted CD/DVD surface using an adapted optical disc drive; these methods have been discussed and prototyped in research labs since 1991.

== Principle ==
CDs and DVDs have a polycarbonate surface and metal reflective layer which allow for storage and retrieval of information. The metal film is sometimes made of pure gold which is highly stable and has ideal optical properties. The metal can act as a substrate which allows compounds to bind to it. This alters the reflective and refractive properties of the disk. Disk reading is based on capturing analog signals with the disk drive. The signals are indicative of how much analyte is in a sample.

Because the disk spins, the platform has the ability to drive the sample through it through microfluidic channels and for multiple steps to be performed, allowing the possibility for sample preparation and more than one analysis to be conducted during a single run.

CD/DVD based assays could potentially be used for any immunoassay already in use and many assays used in analytical chemistry, as long as analytes have a corresponding probe, are soluble, and are large enough to alter the angle of incident.

== Microarray Platform ==
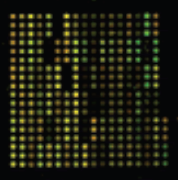
Microarray

CDs and DVDs have a protective film which must be stripped to reveal the gold reflective film or polycarbonate (PC) base. The surface of the disk can be activated to reveal the metal layer which allows compounds to bind to it. Compounds such as UV/ozone or an oxygen plasma treatment can be used to activate the disk to produce a hydrophilic surface with densely packed carboxylic acid groups.

As one-off microassay can be printed onto the activated disks using a noncontact printer to dispel nanoliter quantities of coating conjugates onto the disk. Proteins or antibodies acting as probe molecules can then covalently bind to the disk surface and can be incubated. A polydimethylsiloxane (PDMS) channel plate can also be used to immobilize the probes in a line array. The plate is removed, and the process is repeated with another plate to deliver analyte samples in a line array perpendicular to the probe array. The probe and analyte samples can bind or hybridize at the intersections of the arrays to create rectangular hybridization sites. The disk is washed, rinsed, and dried prior to reading. This process can be done manually or automated; in theory discs with pre-made assays could be manufactured and sold en masse.

== Instrumental Analysis ==
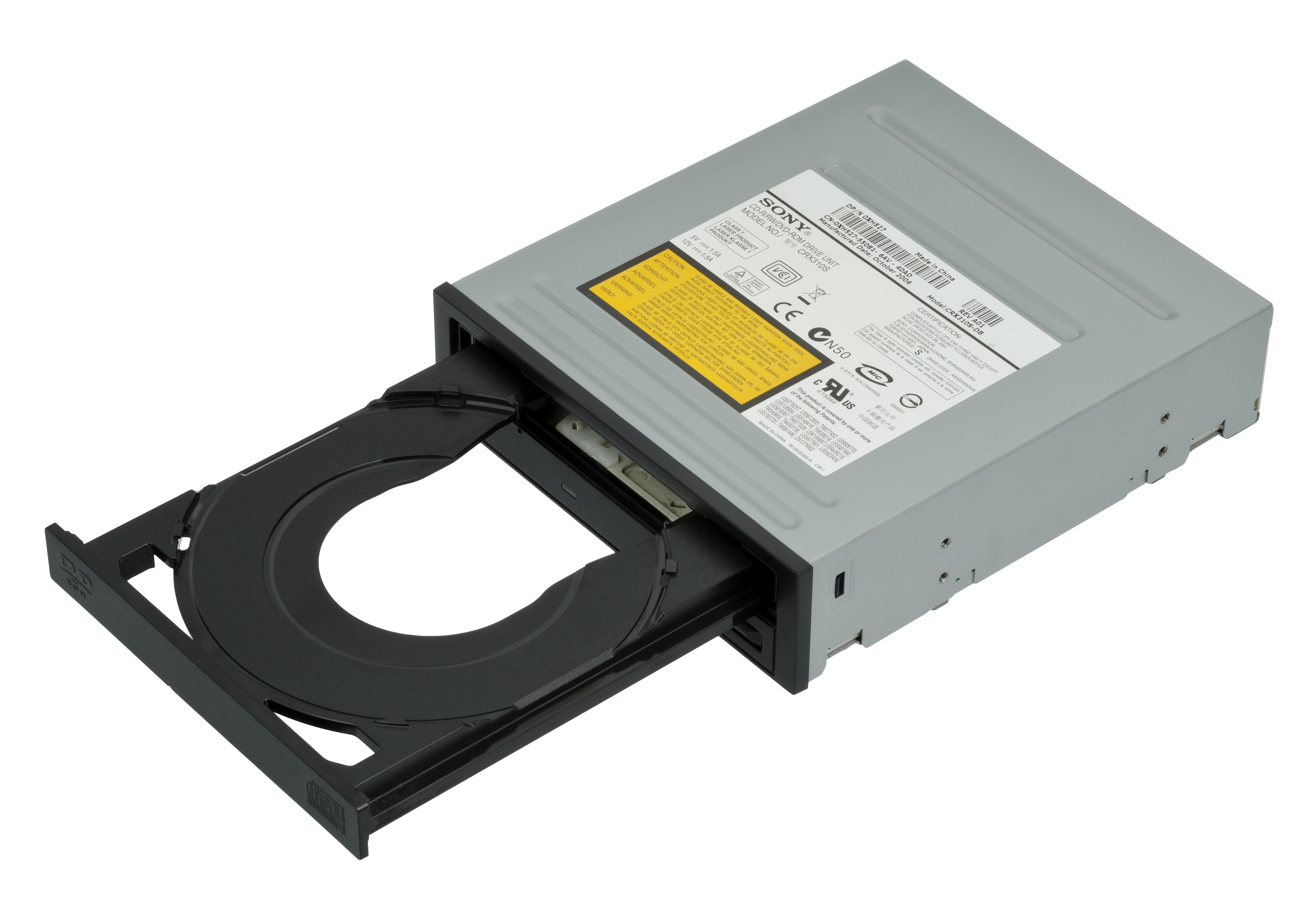
Standard DVD reader

Standard CD/DVD readers can be used to read the assays. The CD/DVD readers contain a laser, set of optical elements which shape and focus the laser, a disk driver, and a signal detector that function as follows:

1. The laser produces light of a selected wavelength.
2. The beam of light hits the analyte in the spots of the microarrays and refracts. The mass of the analyte causes the angle of reflected light to be different from the angle of incident light. The reflective properties of the CD/DVD change based on the quantity of analyte in the sample.
3. The attenuated signal reaches the photodiode of the drive's pickup.
4. Analog signals are extracted, digitized, and converted to an image.

The signal or optical density of the image is inversely proportional to concentration. The refractive index of light, which is directly proportional to concentration, can also be measured. A readable signal is only generated if the sample is at least 200 nm, otherwise it is too small to significantly disrupt reflection of incident laser light.

DVD diagnostic software programs such as Kprobe, ODC, and PlexUtilities can also be used for testing arrays and assays prepared on DVDs. These programs rely on a basic DVD error correcting algorithm. DVDs are organized by sectors which each consist of 2064 bytes. A logical error correction code (ECC) block consists of 16 data sectors. The ECC block is the basic unit for testing disk quality by counting the number of parity inner errors (PIE) or parity inner failures (PIF). The software programs can analyze PIF density which is proportional to analyte concentration.

== Platform enhancements ==
If analytes are too small to generate a readable signal for determining concentration, the assay matrix can be modified. CD/DVD based assays utilize the optical properties of gold. Gold nanoparticle bioconjugates are tracers used to increase the sensitivity of the assay. The gold nanoparticles can be identified with photometric or plasmonic detectors. The smaller the nanoparticles are, the more sensitive the assay becomes.

Silver enhancer solution is also used to increase the reflective properties of samples. Gold nanoparticles have catalytic properties which cause them to reduce silver ions to silver metal. The silver metal deposits on the analytes and causes signals to be amplified. Silver metal is more easily detectable by cameras, scanners, or other drives than is the analyte alone. Still, this enhancement procedure requires many additional reaction and washing steps which could lead to analytical errors.

== Challenges ==
As of 2016, challenges including optimizing sample treatment, optimizing disk surfaces, developing readers that can deploy multiple colors of light delivery and sensing for multiplexing, and for clinical use, obtaining regulatory approvals. The field is similar to lab-on-a-chip platforms.

As of 2010 companies including Gyros AB, Tecan, and Burstein Technologies were working on bringing CD/DVD based immunoassays and equipment to market.

== See also ==
- Bioanalysis
- Microanalysis
- Immunoscreening
- List of chemical analysis methods
