= Immunoassay =

Biochemical test for a protein or other molecule using an antibody

- Illustration of the basic components of an immunoassay, which includes an analyte (green), an antibody (black), and a detectable label (yellow)
- MeSH: D007118

An immunoassay (IA) is a biochemical test that measures the presence or concentration of a macromolecule or a small molecule in a solution through the use of an antibody (usually) or an antigen (sometimes). The molecule detected by the immunoassay is often referred to as an "analyte" and is in many cases a protein, although it may be other kinds of molecules, of different sizes and types, as long as the proper antibodies that have the required properties for the assay are developed. Analytes in biological liquids such as serum or urine are frequently measured using immunoassays for medical and research purposes.

Immunoassays come in many different formats and variations. Immunoassays may be run in multiple steps with reagents being added and washed away or separated at different points in the assay. Multi-step assays are often called separation immunoassays or heterogeneous immunoassays. Some immunoassays can be carried out simply by mixing the reagents and samples and making a physical measurement. Such assays are called homogeneous immunoassays, or less frequently non-separation immunoassays.

The use of a calibrator is often employed in immunoassays. Calibrators are solutions that are known to contain the analyte in question, and the concentration of that analyte is generally known. Comparison of an assay's response to a real sample against the assay's response produced by the calibrators makes it possible to interpret the signal strength in terms of the presence or concentration of analyte in the sample.

== Principle ==
Immunoassays rely on the ability of an antibody to recognize and bind a specific macromolecule in what might be a complex mixture of macromolecules. In immunology the particular macromolecule bound by an antibody is referred to as an antigen and the area on an antigen to which the antibody binds is called an epitope.

In some cases, an immunoassay may use an antigen to detect for the presence of antibodies, which recognize that antigen, in a solution. In other words, in some immunoassays, the analyte may be an antibody rather than an antigen.

In addition to the binding of an antibody to its antigen, the other key feature of all immunoassays is a means to produce a measurable signal in response to the binding. Most, though not all, immunoassays involve chemically linking antibodies or antigens with some kind of detectable label. A large number of labels exist in modern immunoassays, and they allow for detection through different means. Many labels are detectable because they either emit radiation, produce a color change in a solution, fluoresce under light, or can be induced to emit light.

== History ==
Rosalyn Sussman Yalow and Solomon Berson are credited with the development of the first immunoassays in the 1950s. Yalow accepted the Nobel Prize for her work in immunoassays in 1977, becoming the second American woman to have won the award.

Immunoassays became considerably simpler to perform and more popular when techniques for chemically linked enzymes to antibodies were demonstrated in the late 1960s.

In 1983, Professor Anthony Campbell at Cardiff University replaced radioactive iodine used in immunoassay with an acridinium ester that makes its own light: chemiluminescence. This type of immunoassay is now used in around 100 million clinical tests every year worldwide, enabling clinicians to measure a wide range of proteins, pathogens and other molecules in blood samples.

By 2012, the commercial immunoassay industry earned US$17,000,000,000 and was thought to have prospects of slow annual growth in the 2 to 3 percent range.

== Labels ==
Immunoassays employ a variety of different labels to allow for detection of antibodies and antigens. Labels are typically chemically linked or conjugated to the desired antibody or antigen.

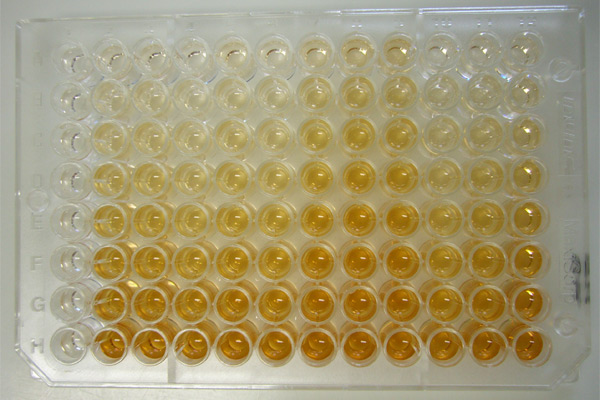
A sandwich ELISA run on a microtitre plate

=== Enzymes ===
Possibly one of the most popular labels to use in immunoassays is enzymes. Immunoassays which employ enzymes are referred to as enzyme immunoassays (EIAs), of which enzyme-linked immunosorbent assays (ELISAs) and enzyme multiplied immunoassay technique (EMIT) are the most common types.

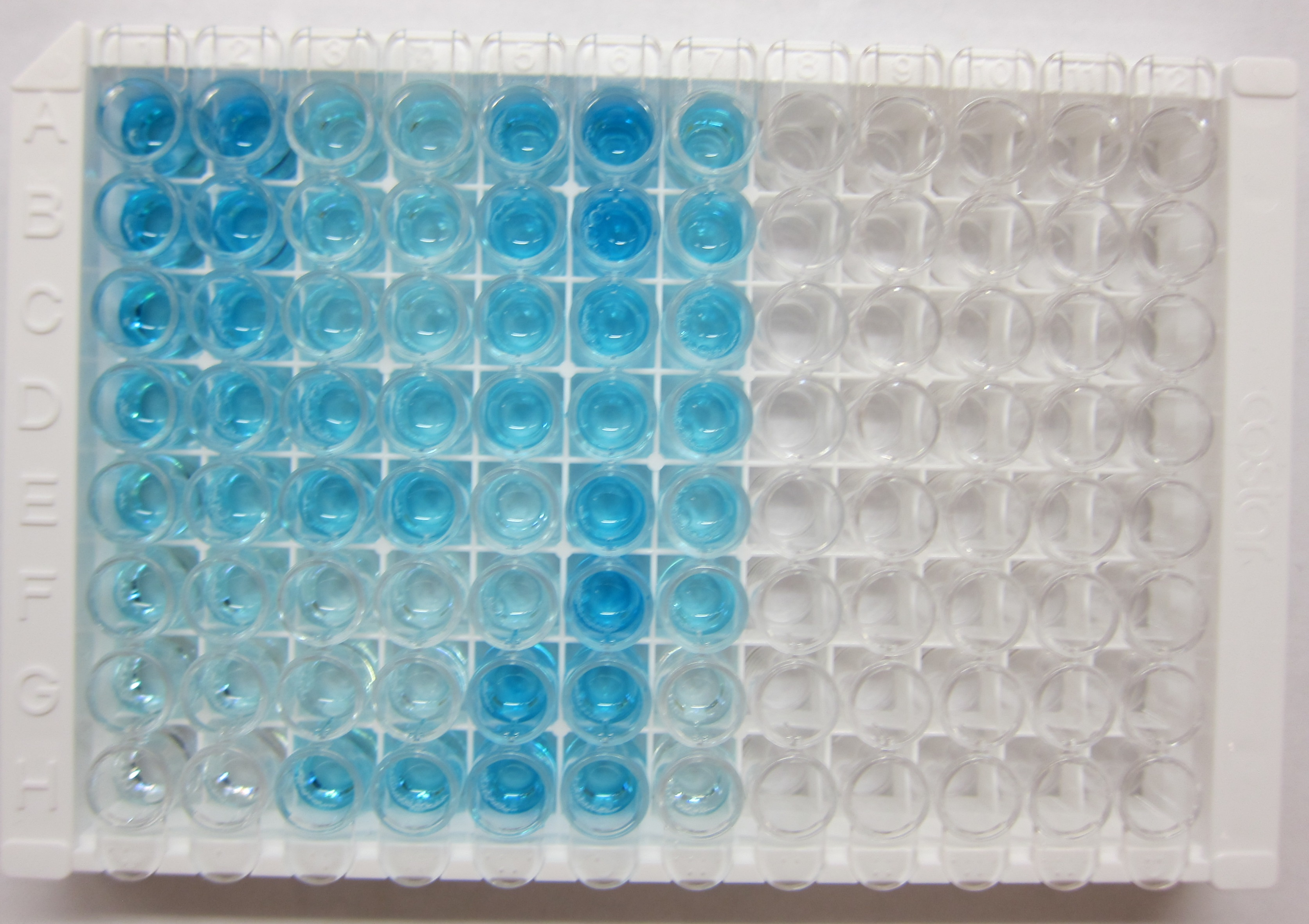
ELISA plate showing various cortisol levels

Enzymes used in ELISAs include horseradish peroxidase (HRP), alkaline phosphatase (AP) or glucose oxidase. These enzymes allow for detection often because they produce an observable color change in the presence of certain reagents. In some cases these enzymes are exposed to reagents which cause them to produce light or chemiluminescence. There are several types of ELISA: direct, indirect, sandwich, competitive.

=== Radioactive isotopes ===
Radioactive isotopes can be incorporated into immunoassay reagents to produce a radioimmunoassay (RIA). Radioactivity emitted by bound antibody-antigen complexes can be easily detected using conventional methods.

RIAs were some of the earliest immunoassays developed, but have fallen out of favor largely due to the difficulty and potential dangers presented by working with radioactivity.

=== DNA reporters ===
A newer approach to immunoassays involves combining real-time quantitative polymerase chain reaction (RT qPCR) and traditional immunoassay techniques. Called real-time immunoquantitative PCR (iqPCR) the label used in these assays is a DNA probe.

Another approach utilizing DNA reporters is the NULISA multiplex immunoassay platform, which was designed to detect proteins at sub-pg/mL (fg/mL) levels. The technology utilizes a sequential immunocomplex capture and release mechanism combined with a next-generation sequencing readout. According to research published in Nature Communications, the platform is capable of multiplexing from a single target to hundreds of targets in a single sample.

=== Fluorogenic reporters ===
Fluorogenic reporters like phycoerythrin are used in a number of modern immunoassays. Protein microarrays are a type of immunoassay that often employ fluorogenic reporters.

=== Electrochemiluminescent tags ===
Some labels work via electrochemiluminescence (ECL), in which the label emits detectable light in response to electric current.

=== Label-free immunoassays ===
While some kind of label is generally employed in immunoassays, there are certain kinds of assays which do not rely on labels, but instead employ detection methods that do not require the modification or labeling the components of the assay. Surface plasmon resonance is an example of technique that can detect binding between an unlabeled antibody and antigens. Another demonstrated labelless immunoassay involves measuring the change in resistance on an electrode as antigens bind to it.

== Classifications and formats ==
In a competitive, homogeneous immunoassay unlabeled analyte displaces bound labelled analyte, which is then detected or measured.

Immunoassays can be run in a number of different formats. Generally, an immunoassay will fall into one of several categories depending on how it is run.

=== Competitive, homogeneous immunoassays ===
In a competitive, homogeneous immunoassay, unlabelled analyte in a sample competes with labeled analyte to bind an antibody. The amount of labelled, unbound analyte is then measured. In theory, the more analyte in the sample, the more labelled analyte gets displaced and then measured; hence, the amount of labelled, unbound analyte is proportional to the amount of analyte in the sample.

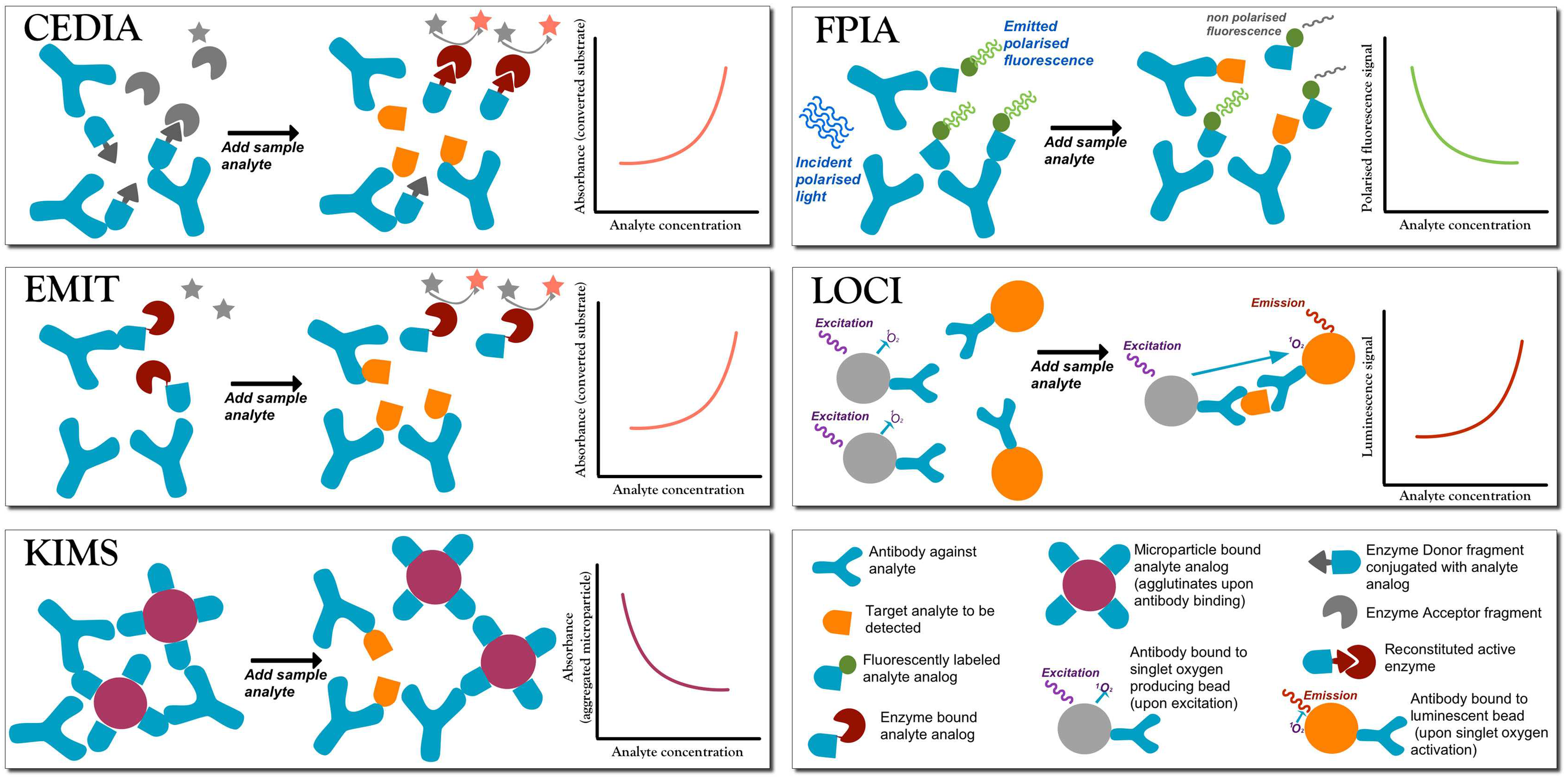
Homogeneous competitive assays: FPIA, EMIT, LOCI, KIMS and CEDIA. See section text for details.

- The fluorescence polarization immunoassay (FPIA) measures the fluorescence polarization signal after incubation, without separating bound and free labels. Free labeled analyte analog molecules are added to the sample, and their Brownian motion differs when bound to a large antibody (Ab) versus free in solution. The analyte competes for binding to the Ab, and if the labeled analyte binds to the Ab, a signal is produced. The signal intensity is inversely proportional to the analyte concentration.
- In the enzyme multiplied immunoassay technique (EMIT), free analyte analog molecules labeled with an enzyme (e.g., glucose-6-phosphate dehydrogenase enzyme) compete with the analyte being tested. The active enzyme reduces NAD (no signal) to NADH (which absorbs at 340 nm), so absorbance is monitored at 340 nm. When the labeled analyte binds to the Ab, the enzyme becomes inactive, and a signal is generated by the free label. The signal intensity is directly proportional to the analyte concentration.
- The luminescent oxygen channeling immunoassay (LOCI) generates singlet oxygen species in microbeads coupled to the analyte, and when the analyte binds to the respective Ab molecule, coupled to another kind of bead, the analyte reacts with singlet oxygen, generating chemiluminescence signals proportional to the concentration of the analyte-Ab complex.
- In the kinetic interaction of microparticle in solution (KIMS) and particle enhanced turbidimetric inhibition immunoassay (PETINIA), free antibodies bind to drug microparticle conjugates to form aggregates that absorb in the visible range in the absence of the analyte. In the presence of the analyte, the Ab binds to the free analyte, preventing microparticle aggregation and causing a reduction in absorbance. The signal is inversely proportional to the analyte concentration.
- The cloned enzyme donor immunoassay (CEDIA) involves genetically engineering an enzyme (e.g., beta-galactosidase) into two inactive fragments: a small enzyme donor (ED) conjugated with the drug analog, and a larger enzyme acceptor (EA). When the two fragments associate, the full enzyme converts a substrate into a cleaved colored product. If drug analyte molecules are present, they compete with the ED-labeled drug in solution for the limited Ab sites. Free ED-labeled drug analog will bind to EA, generating a colorimetric signal directly proportional to the amount of analyte.

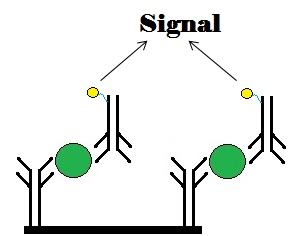
Two-site, noncompetitive immunoassays usually consist of an analyte "sandwiched" between two antibodies. ELISAs are often run in this format.

=== Competitive, heterogeneous immunoassays ===
As in a competitive, homogeneous immunoassay, unlabelled analyte in a sample competes with labelled analyte to bind an antibody. In the heterogeneous assays, the labelled, unbound analyte is separated or washed away, and the remaining labelled, bound analyte is measured.

=== One-site, noncompetitive immunoassays ===
Mixing a sample with labelled antibodies, the targeted analyte is bound by labelled antibodies. The unbound, labelled antibodies are washed away, and the bound, labelled antibodies are measured. The intensity of the signal is directly proportional to the amount of analyte in the sample.

=== Two-site, noncompetitive immunoassays ===
The analyte in the unknown sample is bound to the antibody site, then the labelled antibody is bound to the analyte. The amount of labelled antibody on the site is then measured. It will be directly proportional to the concentration of the analyte because the labelled antibody will not bind if the analyte is not present in the unknown sample. This type of immunoassay is also known as a sandwich assay as the analyte is "sandwiched" between two antibodies.

== Examples ==
=== Clinical tests ===
A wide range of medical tests are immunoassays, called immunodiagnostics in this context. Many home pregnancy tests are immunoassays, which detect the pregnancy marker human chorionic gonadotropin. More specifically, they are qualitative tests that detect whether hCG is present, using a lateral flow setup. The COVID-19 rapid antigen test is also a qualitative, lateral-flow test.

Other clinical immunoassays are quantitative; they measure amounts. Immunoassays can measure levels of CK-MB to assess heart disease, insulin to assess hypoglycemia, prostate-specific antigen to detect prostate cancer, and some are also used for the detection and/or quantitative measurement of some pharmaceutical compounds (see Enzyme multiplied immunoassay technique for more details).

Drug testing also starts with a quick qualitative immunoassay.

=== Sports anti-doping analysis ===
Immunoassays are used in sports anti-doping laboratories to test athletes' blood samples for prohibited recombinant human growth hormone (rhGH, rGH, hGH, GH).

== Research ==
=== Photoacoustic Immunoassay ===
The photoacoustic immunoassay measures low-frequency acoustic signals generated by metal nanoparticle tags. Illuminated by a modulated light at a plasmon resonance wavelength, the nanoparticles generate strong acoustic signal, which can be measured using a microphone. The photoacoustic immunoassay can be applied to lateral flow tests, which use colloidal nanoparticles.

== See also ==
- ELISA
- MELISA
- ECLIA
- Immunoscreening
- Nephelometry
- Lateral flow test
- Magnetic immunoassay
- Radioimmunoassay
- Surround Optical Fiber Immunoassay (SOFIA)
- CD/DVD based immunoassay
- Agglutination-PCR
