= Photopolymerization-based signal amplification =

Photopolymerization-based signal amplification (PBA) is a method of amplifying detection signals from molecular recognition events in an immunoassay by utilizing a radical polymerization initiated through illumination by light. To contrast between a negative and a positive result, PBA is linked to a colorimetric method, thereby resulting in a change in color when a targeted analyte is detected, i.e., a positive signal. PBA is also used to quantify the concentration of the analyte by measuring intensity of the color.

== Method ==
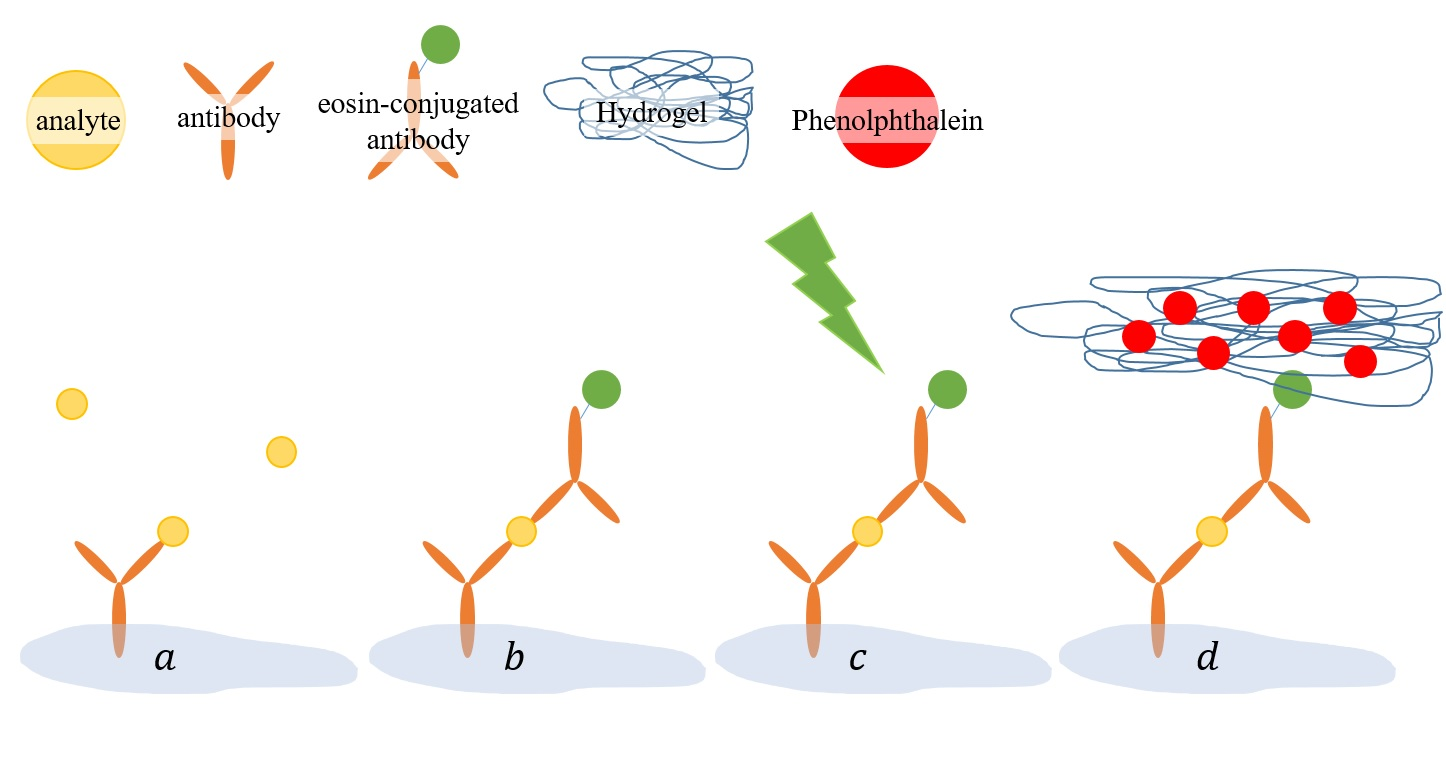
Figure 1. Schematic description of Photopolymerization-based signal amplification

PBA is achieved by sequentially adding three kinds of solutions to a test strip and illuminating it with green light. First, a droplet of a patient’s sample is loaded on a test strip whose surface is covered with immobilized antibodies. If the sample contains the target antigens, they bind to the immobilized antibodies. (Figure 1a)

Second, eosin-conjugated antibodies are added to the patient’s sample. This second antibody specifically binds with the bound antigens, thereby causing each bound antigen to be sandwiched between the first and eosin-conjugated antibodies. (Figure 1b) After ten minutes, the droplet on the surface is rinsed away in order to make sure that only the sandwiched binding complexes are left on the surface before adding the third solution.

Lastly, a droplet of mixture of monomers (e.g., PEGDA and N-vinyl pyrrolidone) and phenolphthalein is added to the test strip, and the droplet is illuminated with green visible light, by which the eosin molecules become excited and produce radicals. (Figure 1c) As a result, propagation is caused and polymers are formed.

Since phenolphthalein molecules are surrounded by the polymers and thus left on the surface even after another rinse, the test strip turns red when a base is added. (Figure 1d) On the other hand, if the patient’s sample does not include any targeted antigens, the sandwiched binding complexes on the surface will not be formed, which leads to no red color.

== Principle ==
=== Regeneration of Eosin ===
Many radical polymerizations, including ATRP and RAFT, cannot occur in an ambient environment because dissolved oxygen molecules can rapidly react with active radical species and form less active peroxyl radicals, thus inhibiting the radical polymerizations. Eosin-sensitized photopolymerization, on the other hand, can overcome this inhibition by dissolved oxygen with only sub-micromolar concentrations of free eosin in a PBA system, which allows radical polymerization even in an ambient environment. A great number of mechanisms have been proposed to explain this special ability of eosin, but the most recent focuses on the regeneration of eosin with the production of superoxide.

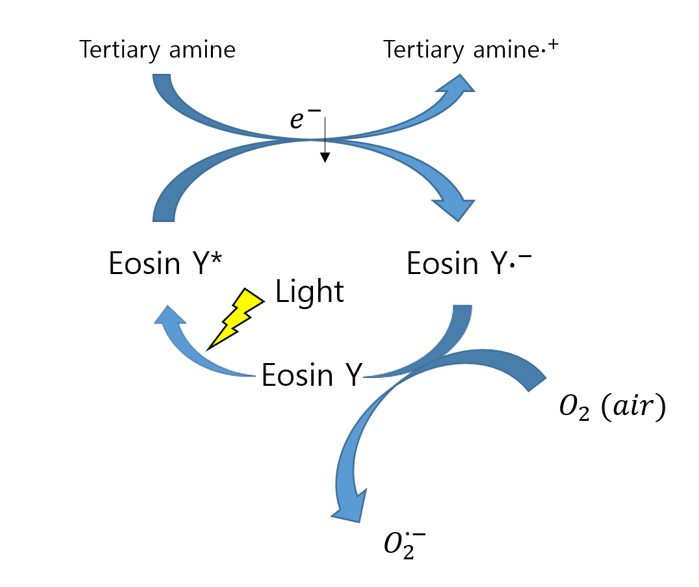
Figure 2. Proposed Mechanism for Regeneration of Eosin

As can be seen in Figure 2, Liang et al. proposed that eosin radicals (Eosin $Y\cdot^-$ ) react with oxygen, regenerating Eosin Y. In this mechanism, when the ground state of eosin (Eosin Y) absorbs visible light, the eosin becomes excited (Eosin Y*). Then, it is reduced—given one electron—through a reaction with a tertiary amine while generating the amine radical and the eosin radical. This eosin radical is oxidized by the reaction with oxygen, so Eosin Y can be regenerated. The regeneration of eosin makes the PBA efficient because oxygen is consumed through this photocatalytic cycle of Eosin Y, so polymerization can take place in an ambient environment even if there is only a few micromolar concentration of Eosin Y.

Eosin Y is not the only molecule with significant resilience to inhibition of oxygen, and methylene blue can also initiate photopolymerization in the presence of oxygen as Padon reported. However, Eosin Y has been regarded as the best photoinitiator due to its long excitation lifetime and low fluorescence quantum yield (Φ), which allows it to react with tertiary amine and generate radicals much faster than other alternatives.

=== Quantification ===
Quantification with PBA can be achieved by measuring intensity of the red color from phenolphthalein because brighter red emerges when the sample contains higher concentration of target antigens. For instance, if more antigens are bound to the surface antibodies, more eosin-conjugated antibodies will also bind to the bound analytes. Thus, photopolymerization on the surface becomes much faster and forms a thicker hydrogel film in which phenolphthalein molecules are trapped. Since more phenolphthalein molecules can remain in the thicker film after further rinsing, the indicators can give a higher intensity of red.

== Other approaches ==
Many other polymerization methods have been implemented as a signal amplification tool: ATRP (atom-transfer radical polymerization), RAFT (reversible addition-fragmentation chain transfer polymerization), and enzyme-mediated redox polymerization. However, many of them are not available in ambient systems because they are susceptible to inhibition by oxygen. In order to solve inhibition in ambient systems, air-tolerant ATRP-based signal amplification has been developed. This method provides better sensitivity (~0.2 pmol) than eosin-sensitized PBA (1~10 nmol), but the air-tolerant ATRP takes much more time (~1 hour) to obtain the high sensitivity than the PBA (~100 seconds).
