= 3,3',5,5'-Tetramethylbenzidine =

3,3′,5,5′-Tetramethylbenzidine
- Line Structure

Names
- Preferred IUPAC name 3,3′,5,5′-Tetramethyl[1,1′-biphenyl]-4,4′-diamine
- Other names 3,3′,5,5′-Tetramethylbiphenyl-4,4'-diamine

Identifiers
CAS Number	54827-17-7
3D model (JSmol)	Interactive image
ChEMBL	ChEMBL1331128
ChemSpider	37605
ECHA InfoCard	100.053.949
EC Number	259-364-6
PubChem CID	41206
UNII	3B3T5CB8EO
CompTox Dashboard (EPA)	DTXSID5026120
- InChI: InChI=1S/C16H20N2/c1-9-5-13(6-10(2)15(9)17)14-7-11(3)16(18)12(4)8-14/h5-8H,17-18H2,1-4H3 Key: UAIUNKRWKOVEES-UHFFFAOYSA-N; InChI=1/C16H20N2/c1-9-5-13(6-10(2)15(9)17)14-7-11(3)16(18)12(4)8-14/h5-8H,17-18H2,1-4H3 Key: UAIUNKRWKOVEES-UHFFFAOYAM
- SMILES: Cc1cc(cc(c1N)C)c2cc(c(c(c2)C)N)C

Properties
Chemical formula	C_{16}H_{20}N_{2}
Molar mass	240.3482 g/mol
Melting point	168 to 171 °C (334 to 340 °F; 441 to 444 K)

Hazards
- GHS labelling
Pictograms	(GHS07: Exclamation mark)
Signal word	Warning
Hazard statements	H302, H315, H319, H335
Precautionary statements	P261, P264, P270, P271, P280, P301+P312, P302+P352, P304+P340, P305+P351+P338, P312, P321, P330, P332+P313, P337+P313, P362, P403+P233, P405, P501
Safety data sheet (SDS)	External MSDS
- Except where otherwise noted, data are given for materials in their standard state (at 25 °C [77 °F], 100 kPa). verify (what is ?) Infobox references

3,3′,5,5′-Tetramethylbenzidine or TMB is a chromogenic substrate used in staining procedures in immunohistochemistry as well as being a visualising reagent used in enzyme-linked immunosorbent assays (ELISA). TMB is a white solid that forms a pale blue-green liquid in solution with ethyl acetate. TMB is degraded by sunlight and by fluorescent lights. Used to detect hematuria as it turns blue in contact with hemoglobin.

== Enzymatic assay ==
TMB acts as an electron donor for the reduction of hydrogen peroxide to water by peroxidase enzymes such as horseradish peroxidase.

Shows the oxidation of 3,3′,5,5′-tetramethylbenzidine (TMB) to 3,3',5,5'-tetramethylbenzidine diimine

The product of the one-electron oxidation of TMB is a diimine-diamine complex, which causes the solution to take on a blue color, and this color change can be read on a spectrophotometer at the wavelengths of 370 and 650 nm.

The reaction can be halted by addition of acid or another stop reagent. Using sulfuric acid turns TMB yellow, with a peak absorbance of 450 nm. The amount of converted TMB may be indexed by the amount of 450 nm light it absorbs.

== Material safety ==
TMB should be kept out of direct sunlight as it is photosensitive. It is not known if TMB is carcinogenic and the evidence is contradictory: TMB is not mutagenic by the Ames test, and did not induce formation of tumors in a single-arm study of 24 rats. On that evidence, it has been used as a replacement for carcinogenic compounds such as benzidine and o-phenylenediamine.
