= Enzyme multiplied immunoassay technique =

Serum and urine test for drugs and proteins

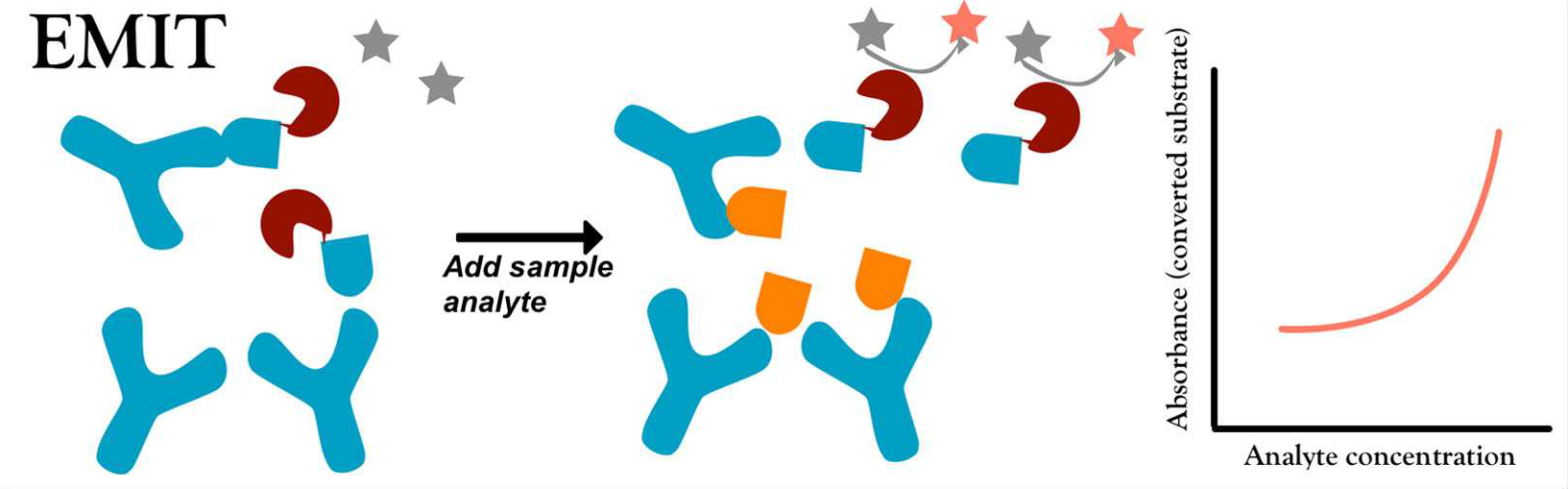
- Other names: EMIT
- MeSH: D017248

Enzyme multiplied immunoassay technique (EMIT) is a common method for qualitative and quantitative determination of therapeutic and recreational drugs and certain proteins in serum and urine.

It is an immunoassay in which a drug or metabolite in the sample competes with a drug/metabolite labelled with an enzyme, to bind to an antibody. The more drug there is in the sample, the more free enzyme there will be, and the increased enzyme activity causes a change in color.

Determination of drug levels in serum is particularly important when the difference in the concentrations needed to produce a therapeutic effect and adverse side reactions (the therapeutic window) is small. EMIT therapeutic drug monitoring tests provide accurate information about the concentration of such drugs such as immunosuppressant drugs and some antibiotics.

EMIT urine assays for drugs such as cannabinoids, morphine, and amphetamine are designed to detect the drug itself or a metabolite of the drug present in a concentration above a pre-specified minimum detection cutoff limit. In the U.S., the cutoff limits must be set in accordance with Mandatory Guidelines for Federal Workplace Drug Testing Programs that were developed by SAMHSA (The Substance Abuse and Mental Health Services Administration is a branch of the U.S. Department of Health and Human Services). The setting of reasonable cutoff limits help reduce false positive results that occur from assay limitations. Because of the social and legal consequences, a positive test result must be confirmed by an alternative method, usually Gas Chromatography/Mass spectrometry. As an example the SAMHSA cutoffs for cannabinoids are 50 ng/ml for the immunoassay and 15 ng/ml as confirmed by GC/MS. Immunoassays that do not conform with SAMHSA, featuring a cutoff of 20 ng/ml, have been shown to produce false positives from passive inhalation of marijuana smoke.

== See also ==
- Drug tests
- Blood tests
- Screening (medicine)
