= Cloned enzyme donor immunoassay =

Competitive homogenous enzyme immunoassay

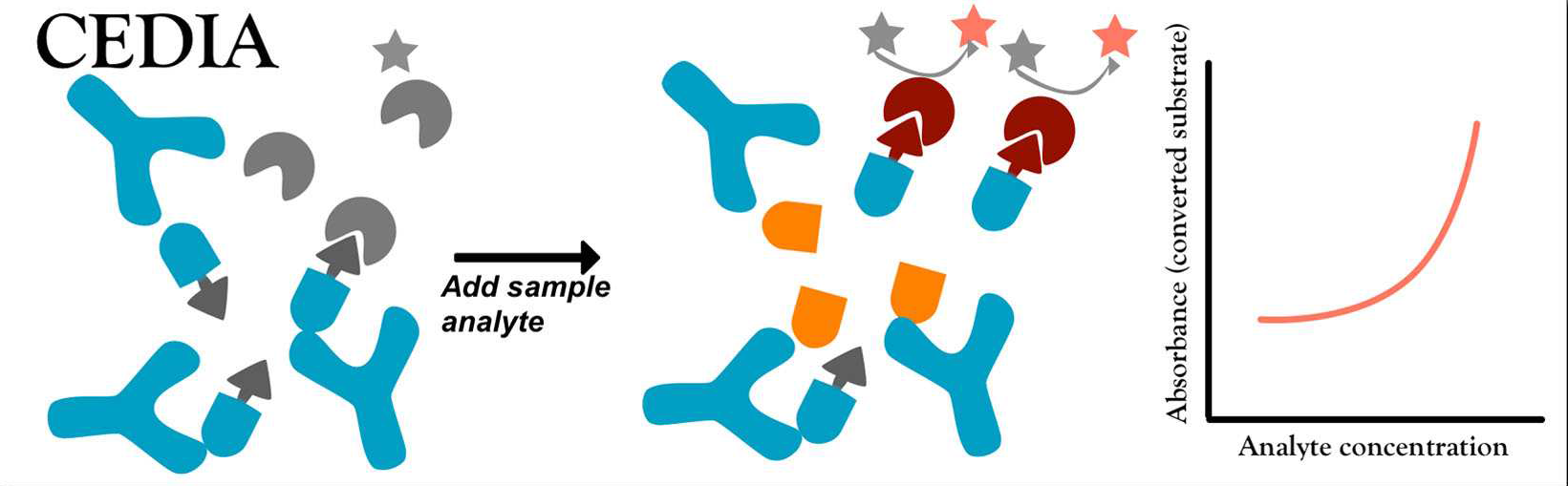
- Acronym: CEDIA
- Type: Competitive homogenous enzyme immunoassay
- Purpose: To determine the quantity of analyte in a sample

A cloned enzyme donor immunoassay (CEDIA) is a competitive homogenous enzyme immunoassay. This assay makes use of two component fragments of an enzyme which are each individually inactive. Under the right conditions in solution these fragments can spontaneously reassemble to form the active enzyme. For use in biochemical assays, one of the enzyme fragments is attached to an analyte of interest. The analyte-enzyme-fragment-conjugate is still able to reassemble with the other enzyme fragment to form an active enzyme. However it is unable to do this if the analyte is bound to an antibody.

To determine the quantity of analyte in a sample, an aliquot of sample must be added to a solution containing enzyme-fragment-analyte-conjugate, the other enzyme fragment, antibody directed against the analyte and substrate for the enzyme reaction. Competition for the antibody occurs between the analyte in the sample and the enzyme-fragment-analyte-conjugate. High concentrations of analyte in the sample lead to a relatively small amount of the enzyme-fragment-analyte-conjugate being prevented from forming active enzyme and therefore high enzyme activity. Conversely, low concentrations of analyte in the sample lead to a relatively large amount of the enzyme-fragment-analyte-conjugate being prevented from forming active enzymes and therefore low enzyme activity.
