= Magnetic immunoassay =

Diagnostic immunoassay using magnetic beads

Magnetic immunoassay (MIA) is a type of diagnostic immunoassay using magnetic beads as labels in lieu of conventional enzymes (ELISA), radioisotopes (RIA) or fluorescent moieties (fluorescent immunoassays) to detect a specified analyte. MIA involves the specific binding of an antibody to its antigen, where a magnetic label is conjugated to one element of the pair. The presence of magnetic beads is then detected by a magnetic reader (magnetometer) which measures the magnetic field change induced by the beads. The signal measured by the magnetometer is proportional to the analyte (virus, toxin, bacteria, cardiac marker, etc.) concentration in the initial sample.

== Magnetic labels ==
Magnetic beads are made of nanometric-sized iron oxide particles encapsulated or glued together with polymers. These magnetic beads range from 35 nm up to 4.5 μm. The component magnetic nanoparticles range from 5 to 50 nm and exhibit a unique quality referred to as superparamagnetism in the presence of an externally applied magnetic field. First discovered by Frenchman Louis Néel, Nobel Physics Prize winner in 1970, this superparamagnetic quality has already been used for medical application in Magnetic Resonance Imaging (MRI) and in biological separations, but not yet for labeling in commercial diagnostic applications. Magnetic labels exhibit several features very well adapted for such applications:

- they are not affected by reagent chemistry or photo-bleaching and are therefore stable over time,
- the magnetic background in a biomolecular sample is usually insignificant,
- sample turbidity or staining have no impact on magnetic properties,
- magnetic beads can be manipulated remotely by magnetism.

== Detection ==
Magnetic Immunoassay (MIA) is able to detect select molecules or pathogens through the use of a magnetically tagged antibody. Functioning in a way similar to that of an ELISA or Western Blot, a two-antibody binding process is used to determine concentrations of analytes. MIA uses antibodies that are coating a magnetic bead. These anti-bodies directly bind to the desired pathogen or molecule and the magnetic signal given off the bound beads is read using a magnetometer. The largest benefit this technology provides for immunostaining is that it can be conducted in a liquid medium, where methods such as ELISA or Western Blotting require a stationary medium for the desired target to bind to before the secondary antibody (such as HRP [Horse Radish Peroxidase]) is able to be applied. Since MIA can be conducted in a liquid medium a more accurate measurement of desired molecules can be performed in the model system. Since no isolation must occur to achieve quantifiable results users can monitor activity within a system. Getting a better idea of the behavior of their target.

The manners in which this detection can occur are very numerous. The most basic form of detection is to run a sample through a gravity column that contains a polyethylene matrix with the secondary anti-body. The target compound binds to the antibody contained in the matrix, and any residual substances are washed out using a chosen buffer. The magnetic antibodies are then passed through the same column and after an incubation period, any unbound antibodies are washed out using the same method as before. The reading obtained from the magnetic beads bound to the target which is captured by the antibodies on the membrane is used to quantify the target compound in solution.

Also, because it is so similar in methodology to ELISA or Western Blot the experiments for MIA can be adapted to use the same detection if the researcher wants to quantify their data in a similar manner.

== Magnetometers ==
A simple instrument can detect the presence and measure the total magnetic signal of a sample, however, the challenge of developing an effective MIA is to separate naturally occurring magnetic background (noise) from the weak magnetically labeled target (signal). Various approaches and devices have been employed to achieve a meaningful signal-to-noise ratio (SNR) for bio-sensing applications:

- giant magneto-resistive sensors and spin valves,
- piezo-resistive cantilevers,
- inductive sensors,
- superconducting quantum interference devices,
- anisotropic magneto-resistive rings,
- and miniature Hall sensors.

But improving SNR often requires a complex instrument to provide repeated scanning and extrapolation through data processing, or precise alignment of target and sensor of miniature and matching size. Beyond this requirement, MIA that exploits the non-linear magnetic properties of magnetic labels can effectively use the intrinsic ability of a magnetic field to pass through plastic, water, nitrocellulose, and other materials, thus allowing for true volumetric measurements in various immunoassay formats. Unlike conventional methods that measure the susceptibility of superparamagnetic materials, a MIA-based on non-linear magnetization eliminates the impact of linear dia- or paramagnetic materials such as sample matrix, consumable plastics and/or nitrocellulose. Although the intrinsic magnetism of these materials is very weak, with typical susceptibility values of –10^{−5} (dia) or +10^{−3} (para), when one is investigating very small quantities of superparamagnetic materials, such as nanograms per test, the background signal generated by ancillary materials cannot be ignored. In MIA based on non-linear magnetic properties of magnetic labels the beads are exposed to an alternating magnetic field at two frequencies, f1 and f2. In the presence of non-linear materials such as superparamagnetic labels, a signal can be recorded at combinatorial frequencies, for example, at f = f1 ± 2×f2. This signal is exactly proportional to the amount of magnetic material inside the reading coil.

This technology makes magnetic immunoassay possible in a variety of formats such as:

- conventional lateral flow test by replacing gold labels with magnetic labels
- vertical flow tests allowing for the interrogation of rare analytes (such as bacteria) in large-volume samples
- microfluidic applications and biochip

It was also described for in vivo applications and for multiparametric testing.

== Uses ==
MIA is a versatile technique that can be used for a wide variety of practices.

Currently it has been used to detect viruses in plants to catch pathogens that would normally devastate crops such as Grapevine fanleaf virus, and Potato virus X. Its adaptations now include portable devices that allow the user to gather sensitive data in the field.

MIA can also be used to monitor therapeutic drugs. A case report of a 53-year-old kidney transplant patient details how the doctors were able to alter the quantities of the therapeutic drug.
