= Lateral flow test =

Immunochromatographic testing devices

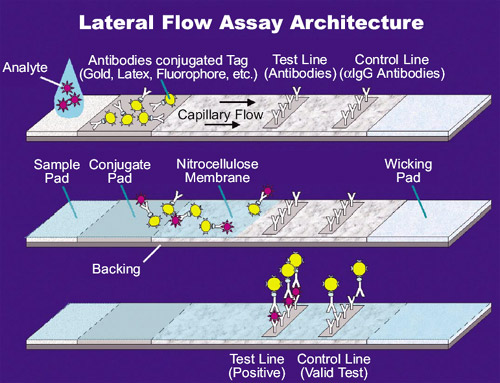
A NASA illustration of a lateral flow assay

A lateral flow test (LFT), is an assay also known as a lateral flow immunochromatographic test (ICT). It is a simple device intended to detect the presence of a target substance in a liquid sample without the need for specialized and costly equipment. LFTs are widely used in medical diagnostics in the home, at the point of care, and in the laboratory. For instance, the home pregnancy test is an LFT that detects a specific hormone. These tests are simple and economical and generally show results in around five to thirty minutes. Many lab-based applications increase the sensitivity of simple LFTs by employing additional dedicated equipment. Many LFTs are called rapid diagnostic tests (RDTs), though this term also includes other formats such as the vertical-flow tests.

LFTs operate on the same principles of affinity chromatography as the enzyme-linked immunosorbent assays (ELISA). In essence, these tests run the liquid sample along the surface of a pad with reactive molecules that show a visual positive or negative result. The pads are based on a series of capillary beds, such as pieces of porous paper, microstructured polymer, or sintered polymer. Each of these pads has the capacity to transport fluid (e.g., urine, blood, saliva) spontaneously.

The sample pad acts as a sponge and holds an excess of sample fluid. Once soaked, the fluid flows to the second conjugate pad in which the manufacturer has stored freeze dried bio-active particles called conjugates (see below) in a salt–sugar matrix. The conjugate pad contains all the reagents required for an optimized chemical reaction between the target molecule (e.g., an antigen) and its chemical partner (e.g., antibody) that has been immobilized on the particle's surface. This marks target particles as they pass through the pad and continue across to the test and control lines. The test line shows a signal, often a color as in pregnancy tests. The control line contains affinity ligands which show whether the sample has flowed through and the bio-molecules in the conjugate pad are active. After passing these reaction zones, the fluid enters the final porous material, the wick, that simply acts as a waste container.

LFTs can operate as either competitive or sandwich assays. Because the target substance is often a biological antigen, many lateral flow tests are rapid antigen tests (RAT or ART).

== History ==
LFTs derive from paper chromatography, which was developed in 1943 by Martin and Synge, and elaborated in 1944 by Consden, Gordon and Martin. There was an explosion of activity in this field after 1945. The ELISA technology was developed in 1971. A set of LFT patents, including the litigated US 6,485,982 described below, were filed by Armkel LLC starting in 1988.

The first commercially available lateral flow device was Unipath's Clearblue One Step in 1988. This product combined Paired Monoclonal Antibody technology (patented in 1980 by Unipath's Prof. Philip Porter and colleagues including Paul Davis and Keith May) and the original Clearblue product launched in June 1985.

== Synopsis ==
=== Colored particles ===
In principle, any colored particle can be used, but latex (blue color) or nanometer-sized particles of gold (red color) are most commonly used. The gold particles are red in color due to localized surface plasmon resonance. Fluorescent or magnetic labelled particles can also be used, but these require the use of an electronic reader to assess the test result.

=== Mechanisms ===
==== Sandwich assays ====
Difference between sandwich assay and competitive assay formats of lateral flow tests

Sandwich assays are generally used for larger analytes (antigens) because they tend to have multiple binding sites. As the sample migrates through the assay it first encounters a conjugate, which is an antibody specific to the target analyte labelled with a visual tag, usually colloidal gold. The antibodies bind to the target analyte within the sample and migrate together until they reach the test line. The test line also contains immobilized antibodies specific to the target analyte, which bind to the migrated analyte bound conjugate molecules. The test line then presents a visual change due to the concentrated visual tag, hence confirming the presence of the target molecules. The majority of sandwich assays also have a control line which will appear whether or not the target analyte is present to ensure proper function of the lateral flow pad.

The rapid, low-cost sandwich-based assay is commonly used for home pregnancy tests which detect human chorionic gonadotropin, hCG, in the urine of pregnant women.

==== Competitive assays ====
Competitive assays are generally used for smaller analytes since smaller analytes have fewer binding sites. The sample first encounters antibodies to the target analyte labelled with a visual tag (colored particles). The test line contains the target analyte fixed to the surface. When the target analyte is absent from the sample, unbound antibody will bind to these fixed analyte molecules, meaning that a visual marker will show. Conversely, when the target analyte is present in the sample, it binds to the antibodies to prevent them binding to the fixed analyte in the test line, and thus no visual marker shows. This differs from sandwich assays in that no band means the analyte is present.

==== Alternative binding mechanisms ====
The LFT principle works with any collection of molecules that bind to each other with high affinity, so long as some of them can be immobilized to the gold nanoparticles and the test line respectively. For example:

- A sandwich LFT that looks for antibodies reactive against a certain antigen is made by replacing the antibody on test line and color particles with the target antigen.
- A sandwich LFT that looks for nucleic acids conjugated to biotin and digoxigenin (DIG) uses anti-DIG antibodies on the gold nanoparticle and streptavidin on the test line.
- A sandwich LFT that looks for the SARS-Cov-2 spike protein uses anti-spike llama nanobodies on the gold nanoparticle, ACE2 on the test line, and anti-llama antibodies on the control line.

=== Control line ===
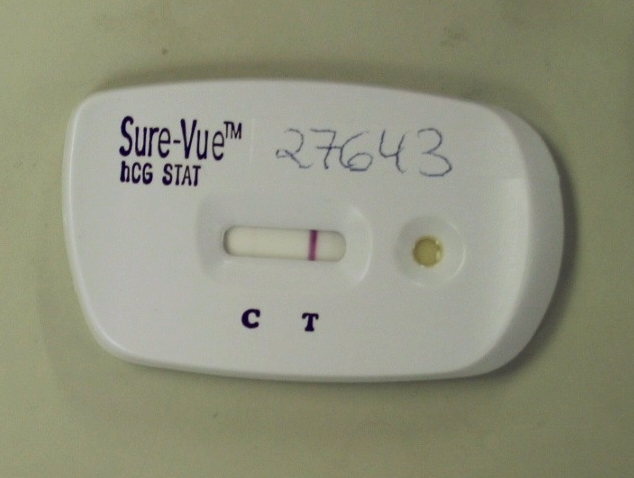
The control line of this pregnancy test is blank, making the test invalid.

Most tests will incorporate a second line which contains a further antibody (one which is not specific to the analyte) that binds some of the remaining colored particles which did not bind to the test line. This confirms that fluid has passed successfully from the sample-application pad, past the test line. By giving confirmation that the sample has had a chance to interact with the test line, this increases confidence that a visibly-unchanged test line can be interpreted as a negative result (or that a changed test line can be interpreted as a negative result in a competitive assay).

=== Blood plasma extraction ===
Because the intense red color of hemoglobin interferes with the readout of colorimetric or optical detection-based diagnostic tests, blood plasma separation is a common first step to increase diagnostic test accuracy. Plasma can be extracted from whole blood via integrated filters or via agglutination.

=== Speed and simplicity ===
Time to obtain the test result is a key driver for these products. Tests results can be available in as little as a few minutes. Generally there is a trade off between time and sensitivity: more sensitive tests may take longer to develop. The other key advantage of this format of test compared to other immunoassays is the simplicity of the test, by typically requiring little or no sample or reagent preparation.

=== Quantitative tests ===
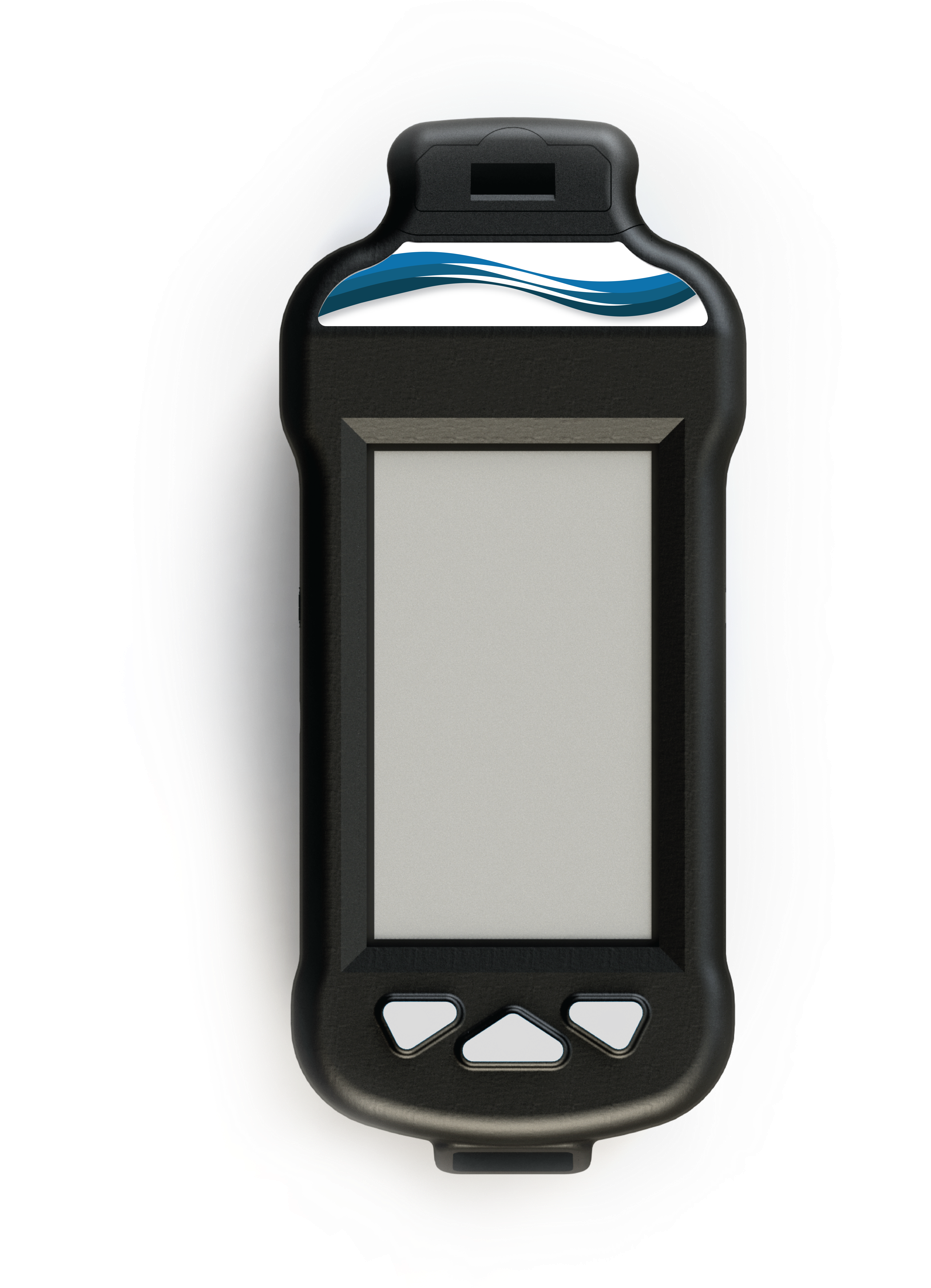
Lateral flow test reader used for digital interpretation of test strips.

Most LFTs are intended to operate on a purely qualitative basis. However, it is possible to measure the intensity of the test line to determine the quantity of analyte in the sample. Handheld diagnostic devices known as lateral flow readers are used by several companies to provide a fully quantitative assay result. By utilizing unique wavelengths of light for illumination in conjunction with either CMOS or CCD detection technology, a signal-rich image can be produced of the actual test lines. Using image processing algorithms specifically designed for a particular test type and medium, line intensities can then be correlated with analyte concentrations. One such handheld lateral flow device platform is made by Detekt Biomedical L.L.C.

Alternative non-optical techniques are also able to report quantitative assays results. One such example is a magnetic immunoassay (MIA) in the LFT form also allows for getting a quantified result. Reducing variations in the capillary pumping of the sample fluid is another approach to move from qualitative to quantitative results. Recent work has, for example, demonstrated capillary pumping with a constant flow rate independent from the liquid viscosity and surface energy.

== Patents ==
This is a highly competitive area and a number of people claim patents in the field, most notably Alere (formerly Inverness Medical Innovations, now owned by Abbott) who own patents originally filed by Unipath. The US 6,485,982 patent, that has been litigated, expired in 2019. A number of other companies also hold patents in this arena. A group of competitors are challenging the validity of the patents. The original patent is apparently from 1988.

== Applications ==
Lateral flow assays have a wide array of applications and can test a variety of samples including urine, blood, saliva, sweat, serum, and other fluids. They are currently used by clinical laboratories, hospitals, physicians and veterinary clinics, food analysis labs and environmental testing facilities.

Immediacy in obtaining results is normally the key factor in choosing this technique, although simplicity and lack of a need for formal equipment are also important factors. These features allow ICTs to be used a at-home test or in pharmacies. Because of their exceptional quality, rapid test are also used routinely in well-equipped laboratories when the demand for test is low.

The broad applications of rapid test can be realized because of their simplicity accompanied by high quality analytical production. The sensitivity and specificity of these techniques tend to be comparable to those of other more complex methods, and on occasion significantly better.

Other uses for lateral flow assays are food and environmental safety and veterinary medicine for chemicals such as diseases and toxins. LFTs are also commonly used for disease identification such as ebola, but the most common LFT are the home pregnancy and SARS-CoV-2 tests.

=== Infectious diseases ===
LFTs that detect infectious diseases may test for the antigen (molecules from the pathogen itself) and/or the antibody (the human body's defensive response to antigens). The choice of which one to test for depends on the specific disease. For example, HIV tests generally look for the antibody as immunoreactive p24 antigen levels diminish as the infection progresses where as the antibody level stays high. The p24 antigen remains valuable for reducing the window period as it shows up in detectable levels in blood before the antibodies do. As a result, combined tests are available for HIV.

LFTs that detect nucleic acids have been developed but are still too new to see much use.

==== COVID-19 testing ====
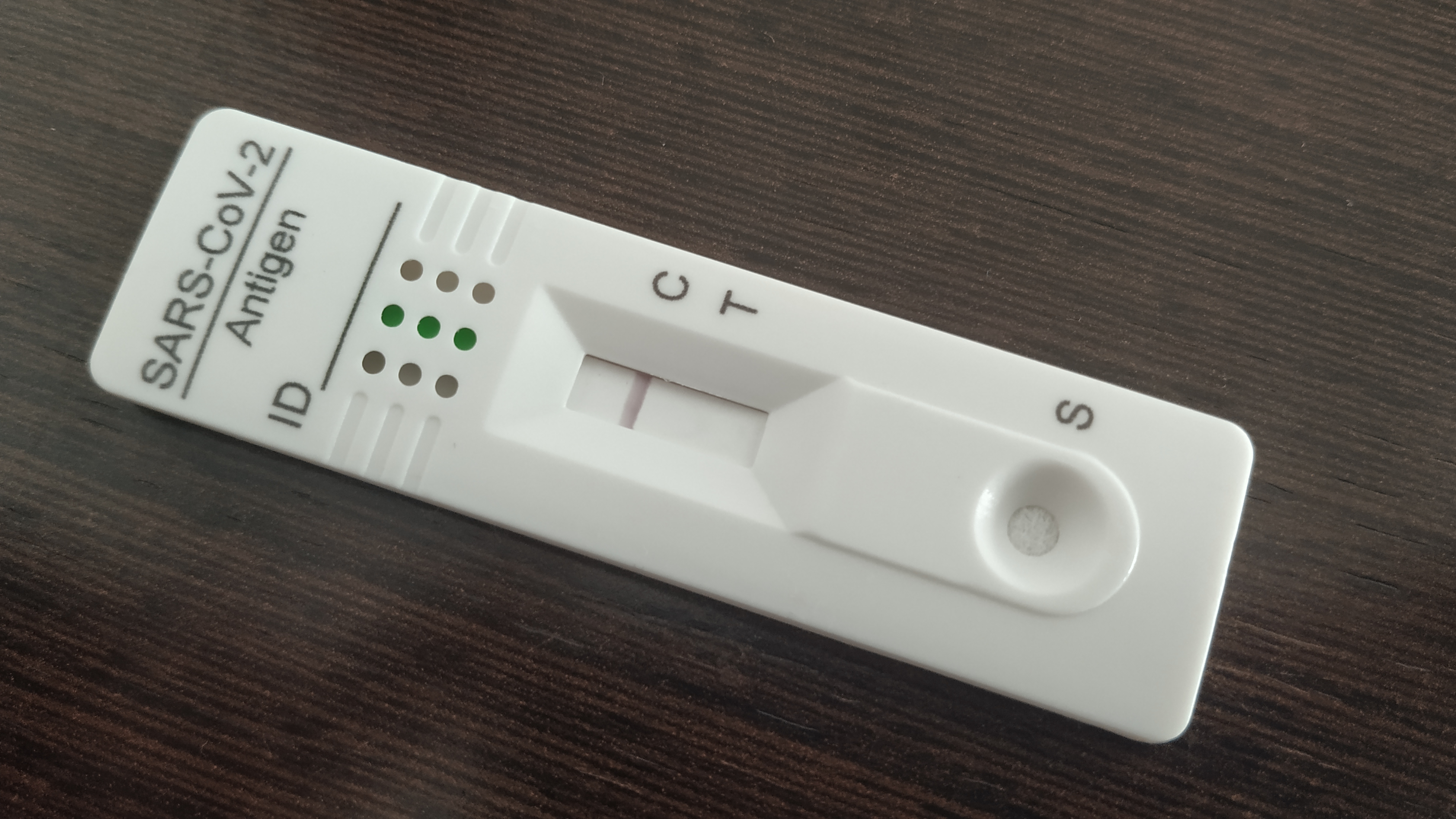
COVID-19 rapid antigen lateral flow test showing a negative result

Lateral flow assays have played a critical role in COVID-19 testing as they have the benefit of delivering a result in 15–30 minutes. The systematic evaluation of lateral flow assays during the COVID-19 pandemic was initiated at Oxford University as part of a UK collaboration with Public Health England. A study that started in June 2020 in the United Kingdom, FALCON-C19, confirmed the sensitivity of some lateral flow devices (LFDs) in this setting. Four out of 64 LFDs tested had desirable performance characteristics according to these early tests; the Innova SARS-CoV-2 Antigen Rapid Qualitative Test performed moderately in viral antigen detection/sensitivity with excellent specificity, although kit failure rates and the impact of training were potential issues. The Innova test's specificity is more widely publicised, but sensitivity in phase 4 trials was 50.1%. This describes a device for which one out of every two patients infected with COVID-19 and tested in real-world conditions would receive a false-negative result. After closure of schools in January 2021, biweekly LFTs were introduced in England for teachers, pupils, and households of pupils when schools re-opened on March 8, 2021 for asymptomatic testing. Biweekly LFT were made universally available to everyone in England on April 9, 2021. LFTs have been used for mass testing for COVID-19 globally and complement other public health measures for COVID-19.

Some scientists outside government expressed serious misgivings in late 2020 about the use of Innova LFDs for screening for Covid. According to Jon Deeks, a professor of biostatistics at the University of Birmingham, England, the Innova test is "entirely unsuitable" for community testing: "as the test may miss up to half of cases, a negative test result indicates a reduced risk of Covid, but does not exclude Covid".

Sensitivity of antigen LFTs used in 2022 was around 70% when using realtime PCR test as the ground truth. LFTs work better in symptomatic patients than in asymptomatic ones, suggesting that the amount of virus present may be too low to detect for the LFTs in many of the false-negative cases. The specificity was quite high at 99%. It is generally agreed that antigen LFTs have a higher limit of detection (LoD) than PCR.

=== Small molecules ===
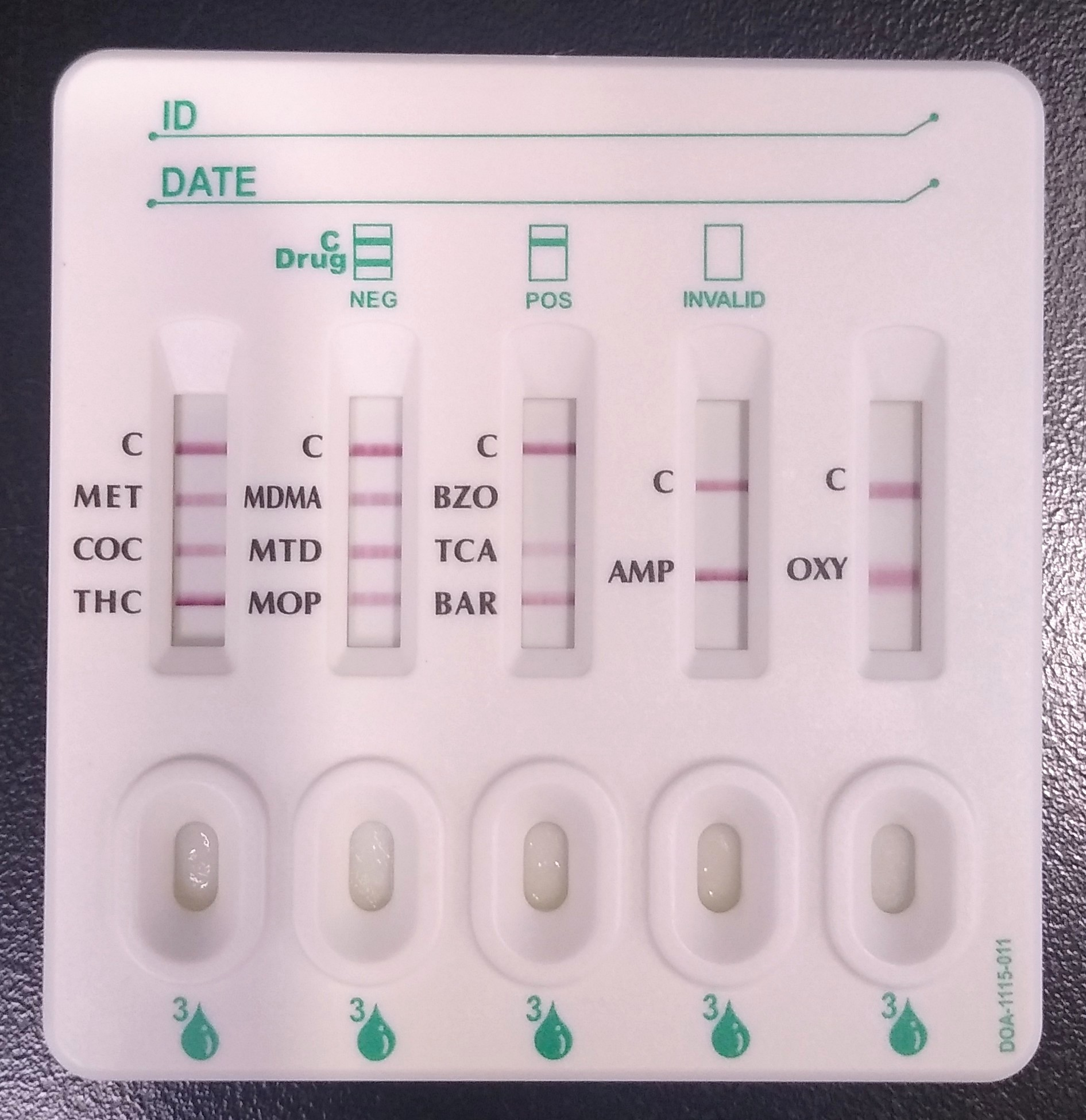
Example of a lateral-flow device used to screen urine for drugs. There is no line present at the benzodiazepine area, indicating a positive screen for this class of drugs. Other drugs, and the negative control (labelled "C"), are negative.

Competitive lateral-flow assays are commonly used for quick drug tests using urine or saliva. In workplace tests, a negative result is generally interpreted as negative, where as a "positive" result is interpreted as needing further confirmatory lab testing to rule out false positives.

=== Biomarkers ===
Lateral-flow assays have also been developed for biomarkers such as levels of a certain protein in blood or urine. The HCG (pregnancy) test is one example.

If the molecule to test for is present in healthy people at a lower level, the assay needs to have an LoD high enough to not show positive for the healthy, reference level. An example is the blood cardiac troponin I (cTnI) LFT, which comes in both qualitative (cTnI > 0.5 ng/L) and quantitative variants. The cTnI LFTs are not as sensitive as a typical lab test, but are sufficient to "rule in" serious cases much faster than a lab test can. Another example is the LFT for sFlt1/PlGF ratio, a predictive biomarker for pre-eclampsia.

== See also ==
- Luteinizing hormone § Predicting ovulation: LFT test for ovulation
