= Immunoscreening =

Immunoscreening is a method of biotechnology used to detect a polypeptide produced from a cloned gene. The term encompasses several different techniques designed for protein identification, such as Western blotting, using recombinant DNA, and analyzing antibody-peptide interactions.

Clones are screened for the presence of the gene product: the resulting protein. This strategy requires first that a gene library is implemented in an expression vector, and that antiserum to the protein is available. Radioactivity or an enzyme is coupled generally with the secondary antibody. The radioactivity/enzyme linked secondary antibody can be purchased commercially and can detect different antigens. In commercial diagnostics labs, labelled primary antibodies are also used. The antigen-antibody interaction is used in the immunoscreening of several diseases.

== See also ==
- ELISA
- Blots
