= Banting Lectures =

The Banting Lectures, refer to an annual presentation delivered by the recipient of the Banting Medal for Scientific Achievement, and are therefore also known as the Banting Medal for Scientific Achievement Lectures. The award is given to an expert of diabetes and represents the highest scientific honor conferred by the American Diabetes Association. It is named after Canadian physician Sir Frederick Banting, who was a seminal scientist, doctor and Nobel laureate for the co-discovery of insulin. The Banting Lectures should not be confused with the Banting Memorial Lecture, which is also an annual lecture series but organized by Diabetes UK.

== List of past Banting lectures ==
- 1952: Insulin, Charles H. Best, PMID 12979967
- 1954: Hormones of the Pituitary Posterior Lobe, Sir Henry Dale, PMID 14365538
- 1956: Recent Advances in Insulin Research, William C. Stadie, PMID 13356715
- 1957: Certain Aspects of the Metabolism of Glycogen, DeWitt Stetten Jr. PMID 13461755
- 1959: The Adrenal and Diabetes: Some Interactions and Interrelations, George W. Thorn, Albert E. Renold, George F. Cahill Jr. PMID 13838198
- 1960: Childhood Diabetes: Its Course, and Influence on the Second and Third Generations, Priscilla White, PMID 13784844
- 1961: Concerning the Mechanisms of Insulin Action, Rachmiel Levine, PMID 14464644
- 1963: Hormonal Factors of Diabetic Ketosis, Bernardo A. Houssay, PMID 14075320
- 1965: Some Current Controversies in Diabetes Research, Solomon A. Berson, Rosalyn S. Yalow, PMID 5318828
- 1967: Angiopathy in Diabetes: An Unsolved Problem, Alexander Marble, PMID 4866594
- 1968: Fifty Years of Diabetes in Perspective, Arthur R. Colwell Sr. PMID 4878652
- 1971: Physiology of Insulin In Man, George F. Cahill Jr. PMID 4941092
- 1973: Islet Differentiation, Organ Culture, and Transplantation, Arnold Lazarow, Lemen J. Wells, Anna-Mary Carpenter, Orion D. Hegre, Robert J. Leonard, Robert C. McEvoy, PMID 4128246
- 1975: Diabetes and the Alpha Cell, Roger H. Unger, PMID 814024
- 1980: Of Pregnancy and Progeny, Norbert Freinkel, PMID 7002669
- 1981: Macro- and Micro-Domains in the Endocrine Pancreas, Lelio Orci PMID 6759269
- 1986: Does a Common Mechanism Induce the Diverse Complications of Diabetes?, Albert I. Winegrad, PMID 3026877
- 1987: Insulin Signaling Mechanisms, Joseph Larner, PMID 2836249
- 1988: Role of Insulin Resistance in Human Disease, Gerald M. Reaven, PMID 9058458 and doi:10.2337/diabetes.37.12.1595 PMID 3056758
- 1989: Structure and Function of Insulin Receptors, Ora M. Rosen, PMID 2555239
- 1990: β-Cells in Type II Diabetes Mellitus, Daniel Porte, Jr. doi:10.2337/diab.40.2.166
- 1991: Type 2 (non-insulin-dependent) diabetes mellitus: the thrifty phenotype hypothesis, C.N. Hales, doi:10.1007/BF00400248
- 1994: Hypoglycemia: The Limiting Factor in the Management of IDDM, Philip E. Cryer, PMID 7926315
- 1995: A Lesson in Metabolic Regulation Inspired by the Glucokinase Glucose Sensor Paradigm, Franz M. Matschinsky, doi:10.2337/diabetes.45.2.223 PMID 8549869
- 1997: Control of Glucose Uptake and Release by the Liver In Vivo, Alan D. Cherrington, PMID 10331429
- 2001: Dysregulation of Fatty Acid Metabolism in the Etiology of Type 2 Diabetes, J. Denis McGarry, PMID 11756317
- 2002 Samuel W. Cushman, PhD
- 2003: Autoimmune Diabetes and the Circle of Tolerance, Aldo A. Rossini, PMID 14747275
- 2004: The Pathobiology of Diabetic Complications: A Unifying Mechanism, Michael Brownlee, doi:10.2337/diabetes.54.6.1615 PMID 15919781
- 2005: Critical Conversations: Fat, Brain, and the Regulation of Energy Balance, Jeffrey S. Flier
- 2006a: Cure, Optimal Care and Total Commitment: What if they happened tomorrow?, Robert A. Rizza
- 2006b: Harmony and Discord in the Orchestration of Glucose Metabolism, Richard Bergman
- 2009a: From the Triumvirate to the Ominous Octet: A New Paradigm for the Treatment of Type 2 Diabetes Mellitus, Ralph A. DeFronzo, PMID 19336687
- 2009b: An Unfinished Journey—Type 1 Diabetes—Molecular Pathogenesis to Prevention, George S. Eisenbarth, PMID 20350969
- 2011: Hyperinsulinemia: Cause or Consequence?, Barbara E. Corkey, PMID 22187369
- 2012: Regulation of Adipogenesis: Toward New Therapeutics for Metabolic Disease, Bruce M. Spiegelman, PMID 23704518
- 2014: Deciphering Metabolic Messages From the Gut Drives Therapeutic Innovation, Daniel J. Drucker, PMID 25614665
- 2015: The Multifaceted Roles of Adipose Tissue—Therapeutic Targets for Diabetes and Beyond, Philipp E. Scherer, PMID 27222389
- 2016: Adipose Tissue, Inter-Organ Communication, and the Path to Type 2 Diabetes, Barbara B. Kahn, MD, PMID 30573674
- 2017 Insulin Action Research and the Future of Diabetes Treatment, Domenico Accili, MD PMID 30135131
- 2018 Mechanisms of Insulin Resistance: Implications for Obesity, Lipodystrophy and Type 2 Diabetes Gerald I. Shulman, ADA
- 2019 “Treasure Your Exceptions”—Studying Human Extreme Phenotypes to Illuminate Metabolic Health and Disease, Stephen P. O’Rahilly, PMID 33355307
- 2020 A Journey in Diabetes: From Clinical Physiology to Novel Therapeutics, Ele Ferrannini, PMID 33472943
- 2021 Treatment of Type 2 Diabetes and Obesity on the Basis of the Incretin System, Jens Juul Holst, PMID 34711671
- 2022 K-ATP Channels and the Metabolic Regulation of Insulin Secretion in Health and Disease Frances M. Ashcroft PMID 37815796
- 2023 Overcoming Obesity: The Discovery of Multi Receptor Drugs, Matthias Tschöp, MD ADA
- 2024 The Science of Diabetes and a Life of Trials, Rury R. Holman PMID 39836885
- 2025 Revisiting the β-cell: The Key to the Type 2 Diabetes Puzzle, Steven E. Kahn ADA Meeting News

== See also ==
- Banting Medal
