= Banting Medal =

Award offered by the American Diabetes Association to scientists in medical fields

The Banting Medal, officially the Banting Medal for Scientific Achievement, is an annual award conferred by the American Diabetes Association (ADA), which is the highest award of ADA. Inaugurated in 1941, the prize is given in memory of Sir Frederick Banting, a key discoverer of insulin and its therapeutic use.

== Laureates ==
- 1941: Elliott P. Joslin
- 1942: William Muhlberg
- 1943: Fred W. Hipwell
- 1944: Leonard G. Rowntree
- 1946: Bernardo Alberto Houssay, Hans Christian Hagedorn, Robert Daniel Lawrence, Eugene Lindsay Opie, University of Toronto
- 1947: George Henry Alexander Clowes
- 1948: Rollin Turner Woodyatt
- 1949: Herbert M. Evans, Frederick Madison Allen
- 1950: Frank George Young
- 1951: Cyril Norman Hugh Long
- 1952: Robert Russell Bensley
- 1953: Shields Warren, Walter R. Campbell, Andrew Almon Fletcher
- 1954: Henry Hallett Dale
- 1955: Carl Ferdinand Cori, Eugene Floyd DuBois
- 1956: William C. Stadie, Louis Harry Newburgh
- 1957: DeWitt Stetten Jr., John Raymond Murlin
- 1958: Jerome W. Conn, William H. Olmsted
- 1959: George Widmer Thorn, Elexious Thompson Bell
- 1960: Priscilla White, James Collip
- 1961: Rachmiel Levine
- 1962: Albert Baird Hastings
- 1963: Bernardo Alberto Houssay, Garfield G. Duncan
- 1964: Francis Dring Wetherill Lukens, Moses Barron, Joseph Pierre Hoet, Leland S. McKittrick, Peter J. Moloney, David A. Scott, Haim Ernst Wertheimer
- 1965: Solomon Aaron Berson, I. Arthur Mirsky
- 1966: Robert Hardin Williams
- 1967: Alexander Marble
- 1968: Arthur R. Colwell
- 1969: Earl Wilbur Sutherland, Robert L. Jackson
- 1970: Paul Eston Lacy
- 1971: George F. Cahill Jr., William R. Kirtley
- 1972: Dorothy Crowfoot Hodgkin
- 1973: Arnold Lazarow
- 1974: Albert Renold
- 1975: Roger H. Unger
- 1976: Donald F. Steiner
- 1977: David M. Kipnis
- 1978: Stefan S. Fajans
- 1979: Charles Rawlinson Park
- 1980: Norbert Freinkel
- 1981: Lelio Orci
- 1982: Jesse Roth
- 1983: Arthur H. Rubenstein
- 1984: Daniel W. Foster
- 1985: Bjorn Nerup
- 1986: Albert I. Winegrad
- 1987: Joseph Larner
- 1988: Gerald Reaven
- 1989: Ora Rosen
- 1990: Daniel Porte Jr.
- 1991: Mladen Vranic
- 1992: Gian Franco Bottazzo
- 1993: C. Ronald Kahn
- 1994: Philip E. Cryer
- 1995: Franz M. Matschinsky
- 1996: Peter H. Bennett
- 1997: Alan D. Cherrington
- 1998: Jerrold M. Olefsky
- 1999: Anthony Cerami
- 2000: Michael P. Czech
- 2001: John Denis McGarry
- 2002: Samuel W. Cushman
- 2003: Aldo A. Rossini
- 2004: Michael A. Brownlee
- 2005: Jeffrey Scott Flier
- 2006: Richard N. Bergman
- 2007: Robert Stanley Sherwin
- 2008: Ralph A. DeFronzo
- 2009: George Eisenbarth
- 2010: Robert A. Rizza
- 2011: Barbara E. Corkey
- 2012: Bruce M. Spiegelman
- 2013: Graeme I. Bell
- 2014: Daniel J. Drucker
- 2015: Philipp E. Scherer
- 2016: Barbara Kahn
- 2017: Domenico Accili
- 2018: Gerald I. Shulman
- 2019: Stephen P. O'Rahilly
- 2020: Ele Ferrannini
- 2021: Jens Juul Holst
- 2022: Frances Ashcroft
- 2023: Matthias Tschöp

== See also ==
- Banting Lectures
- Kelly West Award
