= List of members of the National Academy of Sciences (medical physiology and metabolism) =

This list is a subsection of the List of members of the National Academy of Sciences, which includes members and international members of the United States National Academy of Sciences, living and deceased, each affiliated with one of the academy's disciplinary sections. Members are listed under their primary section, and each entry gives the person's name, primary institution, and election year. For deceased members, the year of death is noted.

== Medical physiology and metabolism ==
Name	Institution	Year
E. Dale Abel	David Geffen School of Medicine at UCLA	2022
Edward H. Ahrens Jr. (died 2000)	The Rockefeller University	1973
Harvey J. Alter	National Institutes of Health	2002
Nancy C. Andrews	Boston Children's Hospital	2015
M. Amin Arnaout	Massachusetts General Hospital	2025
Gerald D. Aurbach (died 1991)	National Institute of Diabetes and Digestive and Kidney Diseases	1986
Mary Ellen Avery (died 2011)	Children's Hospital Boston	1994
Étienne-Émile Baulieu (died 2025)	Collège de France	1990
John D. Baxter (died 2011)	Houston Methodist Research Institute	2003
Paul Bruce Beeson (died 2006)	University of Washington	1969
Earl P. Benditt (died 1996)	University of Washington	1975
Jean Bennett	University of Pennsylvania, Perelman School of Medicine	2022
Eugene Braunwald	Brigham and Women's Hospital	1974
Jan L. Breslow	The Rockefeller University	1995
Michael S. Brown	The University of Texas Southwestern Medical Center	1980
Myles A. Brown	Dana-Farber Cancer Institute	2016
Kevin P. Campbell	The University of Iowa, Roy J. and Lucille A. Carver College of Medicine	2004
Anthony Cerami	Araim Pharmaceuticals, Inc.	1991
M. C. Chang (died 1991)	Worcester Foundation for Biomedical Research	1990
Ta Yuan Chang	Geisel School of Medicine at Dartmouth	2021
Angela Christiano	Columbia University Vagelos College of Physicians and Surgeons	2020
John A. Clements (died 2024)	University of California, San Francisco	1974
Jonathan C. Cohen	The University of Texas Southwestern Medical Center	2022
Douglas L. Coleman (died 2014)	Jackson Laboratory	1998
Roger D. Cone	University of Michigan	2010
Jerome W. Conn (died 1994)	University of Michigan	1969
Shaun R. Coughlin	Novartis Institutes for Biomedical Research, Inc.	2004
Pedro M. Cuatrecasas (died 2025)	University of California, San Diego	1982
Ana Maria Cuervo	Albert Einstein College of Medicine	2019
William H. Daughaday (died 2013)	University of California, Irvine	1986
James O. Davis (died 2010)	University of Missouri	1982
Roger J. Davis	University of Massachusetts Chan Medical School	2018
Russell A. DeBose-Boyd	The University of Texas Southwestern Medical Center	2023
Harry C. Dietz	Johns Hopkins University School of Medicine	2011
Vincent P. Dole (died 2006)	The Rockefeller University	1972
Patricia K. Donahoe	Massachusetts General Hospital	1999
Ralph I. Dorfman (died 1985)	Stanford University	1978
Daniel J. Drucker	Mount Sinai Hospital	2021
Gertrude B. Elion (died 1999)	Glaxo Wellcome	1990
Akira Endo (died 2024)	Tokyo University of Agriculture and Technology	2011
Ronald M. Evans	Salk Institute for Biological Studies	1989
Clement A. Finch (died 2010)	University of Washington	1974
Judah Folkman (died 2008)	Harvard University	1990
Donald S. Fredrickson (died 2002)	National Institutes of Health	1973
Jeffrey Friedman	The Rockefeller University	2001
Henry G. Friesen (died 2025)	University of Manitoba	1993
Ying-Hui Fu	University of California, San Francisco	2018
Michael A. Gimbrone Jr.	Brigham and Women's Hospital	1997
Christopher K. Glass	University of California, San Diego	2017
David J. Glass	Regeneron Pharmaceuticals, Inc.	2024
John A. Glomset (died 2015)	University of Washington	1990
Richard H. Goodman	Yale School of Medicine	2002
Jeffrey I. Gordon	Washington University School of Medicine in St. Louis	2001
Carl W. Gottschalk (died 1997)	University of North Carolina at Chapel Hill	1975
Robert Edward Gross (died 1988)	Harvard University	1975
Melvin M. Grumbach (died 2016)	University of California, San Francisco	1995
Roger Guillemin (died 2024)	Salk Institute for Biological Studies	1974
Jan-Åke Gustafsson	University of Houston	2002
Joel F. Habener (died 2025)	Massachusetts General Hospital	2020
Michael N. Hall	University of Basel	2014
A. Baird Hastings (died 1987)	Harvard University	1939
Richard J. Havel (died 2016)	University of California, San Francisco	1983
Roy Hertz (died 2002)	National Institutes of Health	1972
George H. Hitchings (died 1998)	Glaxo Wellcome	1977
Lora V. Hooper	The University of Texas Southwestern Medical Center	2015
Yasmin L. Hurd	Icahn School of Medicine at Mount Sinai	2022
Kurt J. Isselbacher (died 2019)	Harvard University	1973
Elwood V. Jensen (died 2012)	University of Cincinnati	1974
Alfred Jost (died 1991)	Collège de France	1985
Barbara B. Kahn	Beth Israel Deaconess Medical Center	2017
C. Ronald Kahn	Harvard Medical School	1999
Michael Karin	University of California, San Diego School of Medicine	2005
Daniel L. Kastner	National Institutes of Health	2010
Mark T. Keating	Novartis Institutes for Biomedical Research, Inc.	2004
Taroh Kinoshita	The University of Osaka	2025
David M. Kipnis (died 2014)	Washington University in St. Louis	1981
Steven A. Kliewer	The University of Texas Southwestern Medical Center	2015
Brian K. Kobilka	Stanford University	2011
Monty Krieger	Massachusetts Institute of Technology	2009
Henry M. Kronenberg	Massachusetts General Hospital	2024
Paul E. Lacy (died 2005)	Washington University School of Medicine	1983
Mitchell A. Lazar	University of Pennsylvania, Perelman School of Medicine	2017
Alexander Leaf (died 2012)	Harvard University	1972
Se-Jin Lee	University of Connecticut School of Medicine	2012
Robert J. Lefkowitz	Duke University Medical Center	1988
Aaron B. Lerner (died 2007)	Yale University	1973
Rachmiel Levine (died 1998)	City of Hope National Medical Center	1983
Grant W. Liddle (died 1989)	Vanderbilt University	1981
Seymour Lieberman (died 2012)	St. Luke's-Roosevelt Institute for Health Sciences	1977
Richard P. Lifton	The Rockefeller University	2001
Bradford B. Lowell	Harvard University	2023
Rolf Luft (died 2007)	Karolinska Hospital	1977
Robert W. Mahley	The J. David Gladstone Institutes	2000
David J. Mangelsdorf (died 2025)	The University of Texas Southwestern Medical Center at Dallas	2008
Andrew R. Marks	Columbia University Vagelos College of Physicians and Surgeons	2005
John McMichael (died 1993)	Royal Postgraduate Medical School	1974
Emmanuel Mignot	Stanford University School of Medicine	2013
Svetlana Mojsov	The Rockefeller University	2025
Salvador Moncada	University of Manchester	1994
Marc R. Montminy	Salk Institute for Biological Studies	2009
David D. Moore	University of California, Berkeley	2019
Francis D. Moore (died 2001)	Harvard Medical School	1981
Vamsi K. Mootha	Harvard Medical School	2014
Joseph E. Murray (died 2012)	Harvard University	1993
Viktor Mutt (died 1998)	Karolinska Institutet	1986
Eva J. Neer (died 2000)	Harvard Medical School	1998
Maria I. New (died 2024)	Mount Sinai School of Medicine	1996
Emi K. Nishimura	The University of Tokyo	2022
Bert W. O'Malley (died 2025)	Baylor College of Medicine	1992
Stephen O'Rahilly	University of Cambridge	2011
William H. Oldendorf (died 1992)	Veterans Affairs Medical Center	1991
Raúl Padrón	University of Massachusetts Chan Medical School	2018
Irvine H. Page (died 1991)	Cleveland Clinic	1971
Duojia Pan	The University of Texas Southwestern Medical Center	2023
Martin R. Pollak	Harvard University	2014
Hans Popper (died 1988)	Icahn School of Medicine at Mount Sinai	1976
John T. Potts Jr.	Massachusetts General Hospital	2004
Louis J. Ptáček	University of California, San Francisco	2012
Joseph Edward Rall (died 2008)	National Institutes of Health	1980
Michael G. Rosenfeld	University of California, San Diego	1994
David W. Russell	The University of Texas Southwestern Medical Center	2006
Ueli Schibler	University of Geneva	2022
Rudi Schmid (died 2007)	University of California, San Francisco	1974
J. Edwin Seegmiller (died 2006)	University of California, San Diego	1973
Christine E. Seidman	Harvard Medical School	2005
Jonathan G. Seidman	Harvard Medical School	2007
Gerald I. Shulman	Yale School of Medicine	2007
Alfred Sommer	Johns Hopkins University	2001
Bruce M. Spiegelman	Dana-Farber Cancer Institute	2002
Daniel Steinberg (died 2015)	University of California, San Diego	1982
DeWitt Stetten Jr. (died 1990)	National Institutes of Health	1974
Helen B. Taussig (died 1986)	Johns Hopkins University	1973
Peter Tontonoz	University of California, Los Angeles	2020
Roger H. Unger (died 2020)	University of Texas Southwestern Medical Center at Dallas	1986
Martha Vaughan (died 2018)	National Institutes of Health	1985
Gia K. Voeltz	University of Colorado Boulder	2023
Owen H. Wangensteen (died 1981)	University of Minnesota	1966
Michael J. Welsh	The University of Iowa, Roy J. and Lucille A. Carver College of Medicine	2000
Zena Werb (died 2020)	University of California, San Francisco	2010
Jean D. Wilson (died 2021)	University of Texas Southwestern Medical Center at Dallas	1983
James B. Wyngaarden (died 2019)	Duke University	1974
Rosalyn S. Yalow (died 2011)	Veterans Affairs Medical Center	1975
Shinya Yamanaka	Kyoto University	2011
Stephen G. Young	University of California, Los Angeles	2016
Rudolf Zechner	University of Graz	2019
Donald B. Zilversmit (died 2010)	Cornell University	1989
