= Albert Renold =

Swiss physician

- Born: 10 July 1923; Karlsruhe, Germany
- Died: 21 March 1988 (aged 64)
- Citizenship: Swiss
- Known for: Diabetes mellitus
- Awards: Otto Naegeli Prize (1967); Banting Medal (1974); King Faisal International Prize in Medicine (1986)
- Scientific career
- Fields: Medicine
- Institutions: Harvard University; University of Geneva

Albert Ernst Renold (July 10, 1923 – March 21, 1988) was a Swiss physician and clinical biochemist noted for his extensive research on diabetes. In 1986 he was awarded the King Faisal International Prize in Medicine for contributions to the understanding of diabetes.

== Early life ==
Renold was born on July 10, 1923, in Karlsruhe, Germany, to a Swiss physician father and a German mother. He was also a descendant of the 19th-century German painter Georg Friedrich Kersting. He was raised in Switzerland, attending school in Montreux and Lausanne before completing his medical studies at the University of Zurich from 1941 to 1947. He completed his MD with a thesis on diabetes caused by alloxan.

== Career ==
After graduating from the University of Zurich, Renold was awarded a scholarship from the American-Swiss Foundation for Scientific Exchange, allowing him to move to Boston in 1948 as a research fellow at New England Deaconess Hospital, Peter Bent Brigham Hospital, and Harvard Medical School. In Boston, he worked alongside Elliott P. Joslin, Alexander Marble, Albert Baird Hastings, George W. Thorn and George F. Cahill Jr. He was appointed director of Harvard Medical School's Carbohydrate Research Laboratory in 1956 and director of New England Deaconess Hospital's Baker Clinic Research Laboratory in 1959; under his leadership the latter became internationally known for diabetes research. Renold returned to Switzerland in 1963 as a professor of medicine at the University of Geneva. He also founded the Institute of Clinical Biochemistry in Geneva, where he hosted a variety of research fellows and visiting professors, largely focusing on diabetes research.

The main theme of Renold's research during his time in Boston was the effect of insulin on adipose tissue. Based on this principle, he and his colleagues developed a method for measuring insulin levels in blood and other fluids. This technique was used widely to estimate insulin levels until the later development of a radioimmunoassay by Rosalyn Sussman Yalow and Solomon Berson. After Renold's move to Geneva, a large focus of his research was on the synthesis and secretion of insulin by pancreatic beta cells. Over his career, he authored over 400 scientific publications.

Renold was involved in the establishment of the European Association for the Study of Diabetes (EASD) and the European Society for Clinical Investigation (ESCI). He served as president of EASD and the International Diabetes Federation. He received the Otto-Naegeli-Preis in 1967 and the Banting Medal in 1974. In 1986, he was awarded the King Faisal International Prize in Medicine together with Lelio Orci and Gian Franco Bottazzo for contributions to the understanding of diabetes.

== Death ==
In his later life, Renold suffered from a recurrent neurological disease. He died unexpectedly on March 21, 1988, in a hotel in Zurich; he was traveling back to Geneva after visiting his children in Chicago.
