= Jesse Roth =

American physician and endocrinologist (1934–2026)

- Born: August 5, 1934; New York, New York, U.S.
- Died: March 11, 2026 (aged 91); Hurley, New York, U.S.
- Education: Columbia University; Albert Einstein College of Medicine
- Known for: Cell surface receptors
- Scientific career
- Fields: Medicine and Endocrinology
- Workplaces: National Institutes of Health; Johns Hopkins University; Feinstein Institutes for Medical Research

Jesse Roth (August 5, 1934 – March 11, 2026) was an American physician and endocrinologist at The Feinstein Institutes for Medical Research, known for his work on receptors and their role in disorders such as diabetes and obesity.

== Early life and education ==
Roth was born in Brooklyn on August 5, 1934. He received a BA in art history in 1955 from Columbia University, and an MD in 1959 from Albert Einstein College of Medicine.

== Career ==
Roth completed a residency in internal medicine at Barnes-Jewish Hospital (Washington University School of Medicine, St. Louis) in 1961, and a fellowship in endocrinology at Bronx Veterans Administration Medical Center in 1963. Beginning with his fellowship work with Solomon Berson and Rosalyn Yalow, Jesse Roth's research career focused on insulin action. He pioneered the concept of cell surface receptors. His laboratory at the National Institutes of Health, where he worked from 1963 to 1991, elucidated much of what we know of the structure of the insulin receptor and intracellular mechanisms of insulin action. In 1991, he took a position at Johns Hopkins University, and in 2000, he joined the Feinstein Institutes for Medical Research, where he continued to study hormones and their receptors across multiple conditions, including obesity, into his eighties.

== Death ==
Roth died at his home in Hurley, New York, on March 11, 2026, at the age of 91.

== Honors and awards ==
Roth was a Fellow of the American College of Physicians (FACP). He was a recipient of the 1980 Gairdner Foundation International Award and in 1982, he received the American Diabetes Association's Banting Medal for Scientific Achievement. In 2014, he received an honorary doctorate from the Weizmann Institute of Science.
