= Eisenbarth =

Eisenbarth is a surname. Notable people with the surname include:

- François Eisenbarth (1928–1987), Luxembourgish gymnast
- George Eisenbarth (1947–2012), American diabetologist
- Johann Andreas Eisenbarth (1663–1727), German surgeon
