= Gerald I. Shulman =

George R. Cowgill Professor of Medicine at the Yale School of Medicine

- Education: University of Michigan (BS); Wayne State University (MD, PhD)
- Known for: Research on insulin resistance and type 2 diabetes, MASLD/MASH and mitochondrial metabolism
- Awards: NAM Member (2005); NAS Member (2007); Stanley J. Korsmeyer Award (2008); AAAS Fellow (2009); Banting Medal (2018); American Academy of Arts & Sciences Member (2018); Manpei Suzuki International Prize for Diabetes Research (2021)
- Scientific career
- Fields: Endocrinology, Metabolism, Physiology
- Workplaces: Yale School of Medicine; Howard Hughes Medical Institute
- Website: medicine.yale.edu/profile/gerald-shulman

Gerald I. Shulman is an American physician-scientist specializing in endocrinology and metabolism. He is the George R. Cowgill Professor of Medicine (Endocrinology) and Professor of Cellular and Molecular Physiology at the Yale School of Medicine. Shulman also serves as Co-Director of the Yale Diabetes Research Center.

== Education ==
Shulman earned a Bachelor of Science degree in biophysics from the University of Michigan in 1974, graduating with high honors and distinction. He received both his M.D. and Ph.D. in physiology from Wayne State University in 1979. From 1979 to 1981, he completed his internship and residency training in internal medicine at Duke University Medical Center. He then completed his clinical and research fellowship in endocrinology and metabolism at Massachusetts General Hospital/Harvard Medical School from 1981 to 1984.

== Academic career ==
Shulman began his academic career at Harvard Medical School, serving as an instructor and then as an assistant professor of medicine from 1984 to 1987. In 1987, he joined the faculty at Yale University as an assistant professor of medicine. He was promoted to associate professor in 1989 and became a full professor in both internal medicine and cellular and molecular physiology in 1996. From 1987 to 1993, he concurrently served as a lecturer in Yale's Department of Molecular Biophysics and Biochemistry.

In 2009, he was appointed the inaugural George R. Cowgill Professor of Physiological Chemistry at Yale University, a position he continues to hold.

Shulman served as Associate Director of both the Yale Diabetes Endocrinology Research Center and the Yale Medical Scientist Training Program from 1992 to 2012. In 2012, he became Co-Director of the Yale Diabetes Research Center.

He has served on the editorial boards of journals including the Journal of Clinical Investigation, Cell Metabolism, Science Translational Medicine, and Proceedings of the National Academy of Sciences. He was also an Investigator of the Howard Hughes Medical Institute for 21 years and is now an Investigator Emeritus.

== Research ==
At the Yale School of Medicine, Shulman has investigated the pathophysiology of insulin resistance, metabolic dysfunction-associated steatotic liver disease (MASLD), metabolic dysfunction-associated steatohepatitis (MASH), type 2 diabetes (T2D), and related cardiometabolic conditions.

His laboratory developed and applied novel ^{13}C, ^{31}P, and ^{1}H NMR techniques to measure intracellular glucose, lipid, and mitochondrial metabolism in vivo. These methods allowed real-time, noninvasive assessment of metabolic fluxes in a tissue-specific manner. Early studies from his group identified defects in insulin-stimulated muscle glycogen synthesis, attributed to reduced glucose transport activity, in individuals with T2D. Later research extended these findings to individuals with prediabetes and obesity and demonstrated that exercise could bypass this defect and reverse muscle insulin resistance.

Using ^{1}H NMR, Shulman reported that intramyocellular lipid content strongly predicts muscle insulin resistance in both adults and children, and that hepatic lipid content is a strong predictor of hepatic insulin resistance in both humans and rodent models of MASLD.

His team showed that lipid-induced insulin resistance in skeletal muscle stems from impaired glucose transport due to altered insulin signaling, challenging the classical Randle cycle hypothesis.

Shulman proposed that lipid-induced insulin resistance results from the accumulation of sn-1,2-diacylglycerol (DAG) in the plasma membrane, which activates novel protein kinase C (nPKC) isoforms—PKCθ in skeletal muscle and PKCε in liver and white adipose tissue—impairing insulin signaling.

Shulman's lab explored interventions such as weight loss, thiazolidinediones, adiponectin, leptin, and liver-targeted mitochondrial protonophores to reverse insulin resistance by lowering plasma membrane DAG and inhibiting the nPKC pathway.

He also pioneered ^{13}C and ^{31}P NMR methods to measure ATP synthesis and mitochondrial oxidation in vivo. His team identified age-related declines in mitochondrial fat oxidation linked to insulin resistance in elderly individuals, and in insulin-resistant offspring of people with T2D. They showed that chronic AMPK activation drives mitochondrial biogenesis via increased expression of PGC-1α.

Shulman used ^{13}C NMR to quantify rates of hepatic glycogenolysis and gluconeogenesis, showing that the latter accounts for over half of fasting hepatic glucose production following an overnight fast overturning the Cahill hypothesis that hepatic glycogenolysis accounts for >90% of glucose production in humans following an overnight fast. His group then went on to apply the same technique to assess rates of gluconeogenesis in patients with poorly controlled T2D and demonstrated that virtually all of their increased glucose production can be attributed to increased rates of gluconeogenesis and that metformin lowers hepatic glucose production in these individuals by decreasing the rate of hepatic gluconeogenesis. He also demonstrated that metformin suppresses hepatic gluconeogenesis by inhibiting Complex IV and altering the cytosolic redox state.

His lab developed the Positional Isotopomer NMR Tracer Analysis (PINTA) method to measure hepatic mitochondrial fluxes. With this, they showed mechanisms by which caloric restriction reverses diabetes, how leptin maintains gluconeogenesis during fasting, how the glucose-alanine cycle regulates hepatic fat oxidation, and how glucagon stimulates gluconeogenesis via the IP3R1 receptor and CaMKII.

His research has also explored how adiponectin, leptin, and fibroblast growth factors (FGF-1, FGF-19, and FGF-21) regulate hepatic glucose metabolism. Contrary to the prevailing view that insulin acutely suppresses hepatic gluconeogenesis through FoxO1-mediated transcriptional repression, Shulman's team showed that suppression occurs mainly through inhibition of white adipocyte lipolysis, reducing glycerol and fatty acid flux to the liver. This leads to decreased acetyl-CoA activation of pyruvate carboxylase and lower glycerol-derived glucose production. They further demonstrated that increased hepatic acetyl-CoA and glycerol flux—resulting from white adipose tissue inflammation—are key drivers of elevated gluconeogenesis in rodent models of type 2 diabetes (T2D).

Based on the sn-1,2 DAG–nPKC hypothesis, Shulman's laboratory developed liver-targeted mitochondrial protonophores that reduce hepatic steatosis, insulin resistance, inflammation, and fibrosis in rodent and nonhuman primate models of MASLD and MASH. These compounds have advanced to clinical evaluation.

== Selected honors ==
- Elected member, American Society for Clinical Investigation (1990)
- Outstanding Investigator Award for Clinical Research, AFCR (1995)
- Master of Arts (honorary), Yale University
- Outstanding Scientific Achievement Award, American Diabetes Association (1997)
- Diabetes Care Research Award, JDRF International (1997)
- Elected to the Association of American Physicians (1997)
- Elected Fellow of the International Society of Magnetic Resonance in Medicine (1998)
- Novartis Investigator Prize in Diabetes (1999)
- E.H. Ahrens Jr. Award, Association for Patient-Oriented Research (2001)
- Yamanouchi USA Foundation Award (2003)
- Distinguished Clinical Scientist Award, American Diabetes Association (2004)
- Elected to the National Academy of Medicine (2005)
- Elected to the National Academy of Sciences (2007)
- Naomi Berrie Award for Outstanding Diabetes Research, Columbia University (2007)
- Stanley J. Korsmeyer Award, ASCI (2008)
- Distinguished Leader in Insulin Resistance Award (2008)
- Elected Fellow, American Association for the Advancement of Science (2009)
- Outstanding Clinical Investigator Award, Endocrine Society (2012)
- Sir Philip Randle Award, Biochemical Society (2013)
- Elected to Master, American Association of Clinical Endocrinology (2015)
- Solomon Berson Award, American Physiological Society (2016)
- Harrington Scholar-Innovator (2016)
- Inaugural Fellow, American Physiological Society (2016)
- Distinguished Alumni Award, Wayne State University (2016)
- Banting Medal for Lifetime Scientific Achievement, American Diabetes Association (2018)
- Elected to the American Academy of Arts and Sciences (2018)
- Arthur Riggs Award, City of Hope (2019)
- Stanley Mirsky Award, Icahn School of Medicine at Mount Sinai (2019)
- Samuel Eichold II Memorial Award, American College of Physicians (2020)
- Manpei Suzuki International Prize for Diabetes Research (2021)
- Elected to Master, American College of Physicians (2021)
- Fellow of the Royal College of Physicians (2021)
- EASD-Lilly Centennial Anniversary Prize for Landmark Discoveries in Diabetes, European Association for the Study of Diabetes (2023)
- Bodil Schmidt-Nielsen Distinguished Mentor and Scientist Award, American Physiological Society (2024)
- EASD-Novo Nordisk Foundation Diabetes Prize for Excellence (2025)
