= Narayana Panicker =

Narayana Panicker is the name of:

- P. N. Panicker (Puthuvayil Narayana Panicker, 1909–1995), Indian librarian
- Kavalam Narayana Panicker (1928–2016), Indian dramatist
- P. K. Narayana Panicker (1930–2012), Indian religious leader
- Narayana Panicker Kochupillai (born 1939), Indian doctor

== See also ==
- K. N. Panikkar (born 1936), Indian historian
