= Yalow =

Yalow may refer to:

- 13915 Yalow, an asteroid
- Rosalyn Sussman Yalow, Nobel Prize-winning American medical physicist
