= Rollin Turner Woodyatt =

American physician

- Born: 3 June 1878; Chicago
- Died: 17 December 1953 (aged 75); Chicago
- Occupation: Physician

Rollin Turner "Woody" Woodyatt (3 June 1878 – 17 December 1953) was an American physician, known for his contribution to the field of diabetes and other metabolic diseases. Woodyatt advocated a low-carbohydrate high-fat diet to treat diabetes.

== Biography ==
Woodyatt's father, William Henry Woodyatt (1846–1880), was a Canadian-born, American-educated physician who practiced medicine in Chicago and became a professor of ophthalmology and otology. R. T. Woodyatt was helped by his uncle, the architect Daniel Burnham, whose sister Clara (1850–1939) was widowed by W. H. Woodyatt's early death from diphtheria. R. T. Woodyatt's brother Ernest (1874–1922) became an architect.

Woodyatt graduated in 1897 from Chicago Manual Training School in 1897 and studied at Cornell University from 1897 to 1898. He graduated with an M.D. from Rush Medical College in 1902 and from 1902 to 1904 was a medical intern at Chicago's Presbyterian Hospital, which became part of Rush University Medical Center. At Chicago's Presbyterian Hospital, after completing his internship, he joined the hospital staff as an assistant in medicine and later became an attending physician. At Rush Medical College, he also served as a clinical professor and eventually became the chair of the department of medicine.

He graduated with a B.S. in 1906 from the University of Chicago, where he studied carbohydrate metabolism under John Ulric Nef and also studied under Julius Stieglitz and William Draper Harkins. Woodyatt studied at European laboratories from 1906 to 1908, where he studied for a year in Vienna and then in Munich, where he was profoundly influenced by Friedrich von Müller. Upon his return to the United States, Woodyatt worked at Presbyterian Hospital under Frank Billings (1854–1932) and James B. Herrick but became increasingly devoted to laboratory work on "the chemistry and physiology of carbohydrate metabolism and experimental forms of diabetes." Woodyatt was a perfectionist and disliked teaching undergraduates. In 1916 he gave one of the Harvey Lectures of the Harvey Society of New York. During WW I, he served as a major in the U.S. Army.

Frederick Banting and Charles Best's successful isolation in July 1921 of insulin from canine islets of Langerhans changed the direction of Woodyatt's research in diabetology.

Before insulin became available commercially, Woodyatt was one of the early specialists asked to develop insulin after its discovery by Canadians Charles H. Best and Frederick G. Banting. He worked to perfect insulin for patient use and began to produce it in his laboratory, becoming one of the first providers of insulin for Chicago diabetes patients.

During the trial of Leopold and Loeb in 1924, Woodyatt, as an expert on endocrinology, testified as a witness for the state of Illinois against the defense led by Clarence Darrow.

During the early 1930s, leading laboratories in diabetology were Woodyatt's laboratory in Chicago, Russell M. Wilder's laboratory at the Mayo Clinic, and Elliott P. Joslin's laboratory in Boston.

In 1934 the Chicago physician R.T. Woodyatt suggested that ‘The history of diabetes has been marked by recurrence of certain ideas which decline and disappear; only to go through a similar cycle again in an altered form in a new generation’. This has been particularly true of the concept of brittle diabetes which Woodyatt himself introduced in the 1930s. He never wrote a paper on the subject but contemporaries understood it to refer to excessive fluctuations of blood sugar which could not be explained by patient or physician errors; the cardinal feature was unpredictability and unexpected hypoglycaemic reactions. Also in the 1930s, practitioners of the newly formed psychosomatic movement took an interest in the effect of emotional factors on the course of diabetes and, in particular, patients who were ‘difficult’ or ‘refractory’. What marked ‘difficult’ patients was that they did not follow their doctor’s instructions or had recurrent diabetic ketoacidosis. By the 1950s the question was whether there were two distinct groups of patients; one whose lability could be cured by adjusting insulin, diet, and exercise, and another whose lability had an emotional origin. Did proponents of the organic school have patients (unreported) in whom lability had an obvious emotional cause or, conversely, were the psychosocial problems which the psychiatrists unearthed a consequence rather than a cause of the instability?

Woodyatt was elected to the presidencies of three learned societies: in 1916 to the American Society for Clinical Investigation, in 1936 to the Association of American Physicians, and in 1941 to the Institute of Medicine of Chicago (established in 1915 by Frank Billings, Ludvig Hektoen, William A. Pusey, and 26 other prominent physicians). Woodyatt was awarded the 1948 Banting Medal of the American Diabetes Association.

He was a lifelong bachelor.

== Woodyatt formula ==
In 1921 a paper by Philip Anderson Shaffer (1881–1960) and a paper R. T. Woodyatt "presented a detailed theory of antiketogenesis, the underlying principle being that the ketones are formed in the course of the normal metabolism and are completely oxidized, provided that they come into contact with a sufficient quantity of glucose which is itself in the process of oxidation. In the absence of this "oxidizing" glucose they accumulate in the tissues. Both Shaffer and Woodyatt ... published formulas by which to estimate ketogenic balance." Arthur P. Thomson published in 1924 his findings concerning the Woodyatt formula as it pertained to diabetic patients undergoing dietary treatments in the pre-insulin era. Using the ideas of Shaffer and Woodyatt, Clarence Dean Withrow (1927–2006) published in 1980 a new formula for the ketogenic ratio (which is defined as the ratio of the sum of ketogenic factors to the sum of antiketogenic factors).

== Selected publications ==
- Woodyatt, R. T. (December 17, 1910). "The Action of Glycol Aldehyd and Glycerin Aldehyd in Diabetes Mellitus and the Nature of Antiketogenesis". Journal of the American Medical Association. 55 (25): 2109–2112. doi:10.1001/jama.1910.04330250005003.
- Woodyatt, R. T.; Helmholz, H. F. (May 1911). "The Use of Blood Charcoal as a Clearing Agent for Urine Containing Glucose". Archives of Internal Medicine. 7 (5): 598–601. doi:10.1001/archinte.1911.00060050020002.
- Woodyatt, R. T. (1913). "Studies on the Theory of Diabetes I: Sarcolactic Acid in Diabetic Muscle". Journal of Biological Chemistry. 14 (5): 441–451. doi:10.1016/S0021-9258(18)88591-X.
- Sansum, William D.; Woodyatt, R. T. (1914). "Extra sugar during ether and nitrous oxide narcosis in fully phlorhizinized dogs: Sources of error in existing methods for the study of gluconeogenesis". Proceedings of the Society for Experimental Biology and Medicine. 11 (6): 157–159. doi:10.3181/00379727-11-98. S2CID 102248736.
- Raulston, B. O.; Woodyatt, R. T. (March 28, 1914). "Blood Transfusion in Diabetes Mellitus". Journal of the American Medical Association. 62 (13): 996–999. doi:10.1001/jama.1914.02560380020007.
- Greer, J.R.; Witzemann, E.J.; Woodyatt, R.T. (1914). "Studies on the Theory of Diabetes". Journal of Biological Chemistry. 16 (4): 455–464. doi:10.1016/S0021-9258(18)88452-6.
- Woodyatt, R. T.; Sansum, William D.; Wilder, R. M. (1915). "Prolonged and Accurately Timed Intravenous Injections of Sugar". Journal of the American Medical Association (24): 2067. doi:10.1001/jama.1915.02580240023006.
- Balcar, J. O.; Sansum, William D.; Woodyatt, R. T. (1919). "Fever and the Water Reserve of the Body". Archives of Internal Medicine. 24: 116. doi:10.1001/archinte.1919.00090240119009.
- Woodyatt, R. T. (1920). "An Improved Volumetric Pump for Continuous Intravenous Injections". Journal of Biological Chemistry. 41 (3): 315–318. doi:10.1016/S0021-9258(18)87192-7.
- Woodyatt, R. T. (1921). "Objects and Method of Diet Adjustment in Diabetes". Archives of Internal Medicine. 28 (2): 125. doi:10.1001/archinte.1921.00100140002001.
- Woodyatt, Rollin T. (1927). "Psychic and Emotional Factors in General Diagnosis and Treatment". JAMA: The Journal of the American Medical Association. 89 (13): 1013. doi:10.1001/jama.1927.02690130001001.
- Woodyatt, Rollin T. (1937). "The Prevention of Diabetic Coma". Medical Clinics of North America. 21 (1): 11–21. doi:10.1016/S0025-7125(16)37220-0.
- Woodyatt, R. T. (1940). "On the Theory of Diabetes". Transactions of the American Clinical and Climatological Association. 56: 160–172. PMC 2242203. PMID 21407616.
- Woodyatt, R. T.; Spetz, Marseille (1942). "Anticipation in the Inheritance of Diabetes". JAMA: The Journal of the American Medical Association. 120 (8): 602. doi:10.1001/jama.1942.02830430024007.
