= Gian Franco Bottazzo =

Italian physician (1946–2017)

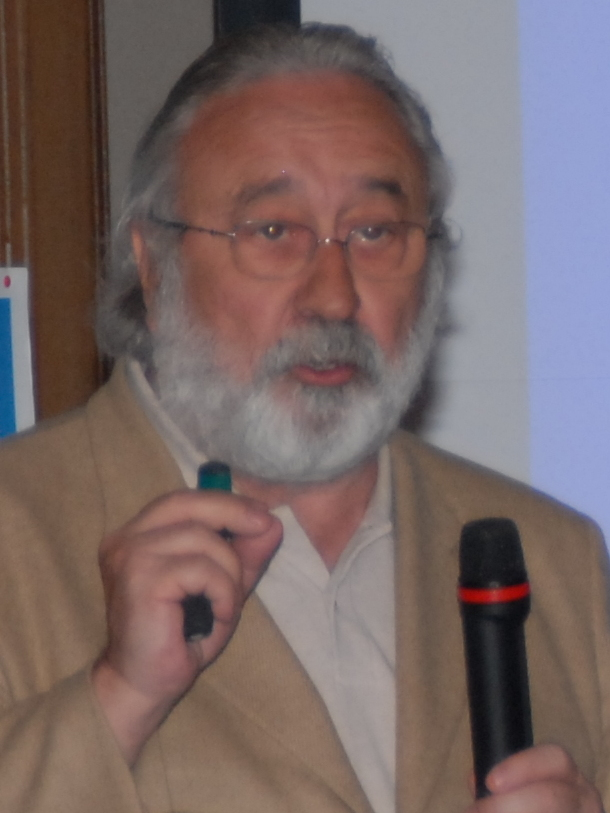
- Bottazzo in 2006
- Born: 1 August 1946; Venice, Italy
- Died: 15 September 2017 (aged 71); Venice, Italy
- Occupation: Physician
- Known for: Research on diabetes mellitus

Gian Franco Bottazzo (1 August 1946 – 15 September 2017) was an Italian physician who spent most of his career in London. He was a prominent researcher in the field of diabetes and autoimmunity, and demonstrated that type 1 diabetes is associated with antibodies against beta cells.

== Education and career ==
Bottazzo was born in Venice in 1946, and attended medical school at the University of Padua. He was a keen footballer, and came close to joining Venezia F.C. before deciding to focus on his studies instead. As a medical student, he spent a summer at Middlesex Hospital in London under the tutelage of the immunologist Deborah Doniach. He graduated from Padua in 1971 and completed his training in allergy and clinical immunology at the University of Florence in 1974. The same year, Bottazzo and Doniach published a landmark paper in The Lancet showing that type 1 diabetes is associated with antibodies against insulin-producing beta cells in the pancreas, thus demonstrating the autoimmune nature of the disease.

In 1977, Bottazzo became a lecturer in clinical immunology at Middlesex Hospital. He also worked at the Medical College of St Bartholomew's Hospital in collaboration with Andrew Cudworth; together they published numerous studies, mostly on the human leukocyte antigen system. Bottazzo became a senior lecturer at Middlesex Hospital in 1980 and was an honorary consultant from 1980 until 1991, when he moved to the London Hospital Medical College as a professor and head of the department of immunology. He returned to Italy in 1998 as the scientific director of Bambino Gesù Hospital in Rome.

Throughout his career, Bottazzo authored more than 300 research papers and 200 review articles and book chapters. He was awarded the Minkowski Prize by the European Association for the Study of Diabetes in 1982; he spent the prize money by inviting a group of friends and collaborators to a banquet in Budapest. In 1986, he was awarded the King Faisal International Prize in Medicine together with Lelio Orci and Albert Renold for contributions to the understanding of diabetes. He received the Banting Medal, the highest honour of the American Diabetes Association, in 1992.

== Personal life ==
Bottazzo's wife was Lamya Al-Saqqaf, an immunologist from Kuwait whom he met in London in 1976; together they had one daughter. He died in Venice in 2017, at the age of 71, from infective endocarditis.
