= Richard N. Bergman =

American biomedical engineer

- Born: Richard Nathan Bergman
- Education: Case Institute of Technology; University of Pittsburgh
- Known for: Diabetes research
- Scientific career
- Fields: Biomedical engineering, physiology, diabetes research

Richard N. Bergman is an American biomedical engineer and researcher known for his work on insulin resistance and type 2 diabetes and for developing the minimal model of glucose regulation and the disposition index. Since 2011, he has served as director of the Diabetes and Obesity Research Institute at Cedars-Sinai Medical Center.

== Education and career ==
Bergman received a BSE in biomedical engineering from Case Institute of Technology in 1965 and a Ph.D. in physiology from the University of Pittsburgh in 1971.

After completing his doctorate, Bergman joined the faculty of the University of Southern California (USC), where he served until 1975. In 1976, he joined Northwestern University as an associate professor of biomedical engineering. He returned to USC in 1980, served as Salerni Collegium Professor, and later chaired the Department of Physiology and Biophysics at the Keck School of Medicine.

In 2011, he joined Cedars-Sinai Medical Center as the founding director of the Diabetes and Obesity Research Institute and was appointed the Alfred Jay Firestein Chair in Diabetes Research.

Bergman's research has focused on the physiology and pathogenesis of diabetes, particularly insulin resistance and type 2 diabetes. In 1979, Bergman and Claudio Cobelli developed the minimal model of glucose regulation, a mathematical model based on intravenous glucose tolerance test data. It was used to estimate insulin sensitivity and glucose effectiveness and contributed to the development of the disposition index. Bergman also studied the role of free fatty acids in metabolic regulation, as well as hepatic insulin clearance and hepatic glucose production in type 2 diabetes. He also invented relative fat mass (RFM), a proposed alternative to body mass index, and introduced reduced insulin clearance as a pathogenetic factor in the development of type 2 diabetes.

In 2006, Bergman received the Banting Medal for Scientific Achievement from the American Diabetes Association. He served as editor-in-chief of Obesity from 2007 to 2012 and served on editorial boards of other academic journals, including the American Journal of Physiology, Diabetes and the Journal of Diabetes Science and Technology.

== Personal life ==
Bergman is married and has two children.
