= Dan Foster (physician) =

American physician and academic

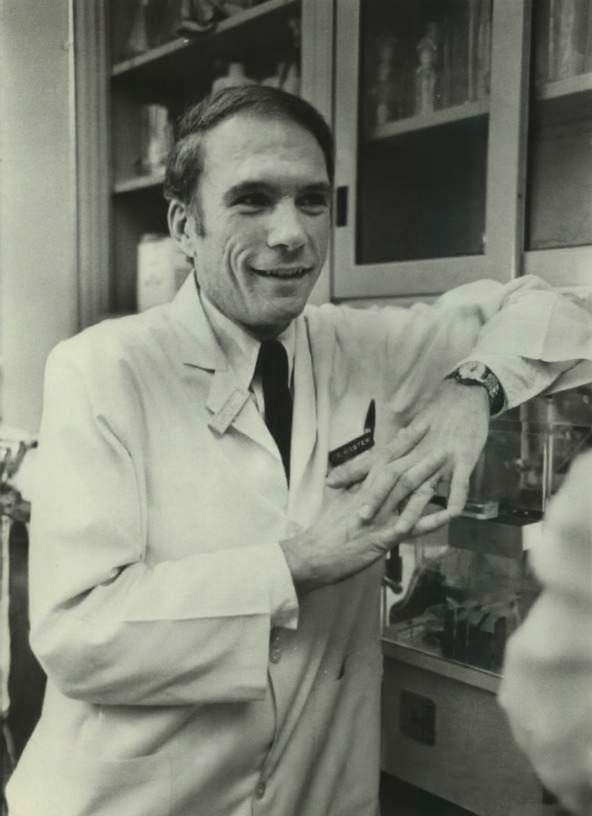
- Foster in 1977
- Born: March 4, 1930; Marlin, Texas
- Died: January 25, 2018; Dallas, Texas
- Occupation: Physician
- Medical career
- Field: Diabetes and Metabolic Research
- Institutions: University of Texas Southwestern Medical School
- Sub-specialties: Internal Medicine
- Awards: Banting Medal, Joslin Medal, Outstanding Alumnus, University of Texas at El Paso

Daniel Willett Foster (March 4, 1930 – January 25, 2018) was the John Denis McGarry, Ph.D. Distinguished Chair in Diabetes and Metabolic Research and Professor of Internal Medicine at the University of Texas Southwestern Medical School at Dallas. He was Chairman of the Department of Internal Medicine for 16 years. He was a Fellow of the American Academy of Arts and Sciences, a Fellow of the American Association for the Advancement of Science and a member of the Institute of Medicine of the National Academies. He was a Master of the American College of Physicians. He was also a former member of the President's Council on Bioethics.

== Career in medicine ==
Foster's research focused for many years on the intermediary metabolism of carbohydrates and lipids. With his colleague, J. Denis McGarry, he discovered the malonyl-CoA regulatory system for fatty acid oxidation and ketogenesis. Awards have included the Banting Medal (1984), the Joslin Medal (1984), the Founders Medal of the Southern Society for Clinical Investigation (1992) and the Lukens Award (1993). He has been named the Outstanding Clinician in the Field of Diabetes and Outstanding Physician Educator in the Field of Diabetes by the American Diabetes Association. He received the Robert H. Williams Distinguished Chair of Medicine Award of the Association of Professors of Medicine in February 2001. He was named Great Teacher by the National Institutes of Health in 2002.

Foster was associate editor of the Journal of Clinical Investigation from 1972 to 1977 and was editor of Diabetes from 1978 to 1983. He is co-editor (with J.D. Wilson) of the 7th, 8th and 9th editions of the Williams Textbook of Endocrinology and writes for a number of other textbooks.

Foster was the host of the nationally televised program, "Daniel Foster, MD" for four seasons on the Public Broadcasting Service. The weekly program was also shown on the British Broadcasting Corporation. He was appointed to the President's Council on Bioethics by President Bush in January 2002 and was reappointed for a third term in 2005. He is a board member of the Academy of Medicine, Engineering and Science of Texas and served as president in 2007.

== Awards ==
- Banting Medal 1984
- Joslin Medal 1984
- Outstanding Alumnus, University of Texas at El Paso 1987
- Multiple Outstanding Teacher Awards, Southwestern Medical School (26)
- Outstanding Clinician in the Field of Diabetes 1987 (American Diabetes Association)
- Upjohn Award for Outstanding Physician Educator in the Field of Diabetes - 1988
- (American Diabetes Association)
- Founders Medal, Southern Society for Clinical Investigation – 1992
- Lukens Award, 1993 (American Diabetes Assoc., Pennsylvania Affiliate)
- Robert H. Williams Distinguished Chair of Medicine Award - 2001
- Great Teacher Award (National Institutes of Health) – 2002
- The Daniel W. Martin Science Award – 2005
- Eric G. Neilson, M.D., Distinguished Professor Award – 2007 (Assoc of Specialty Professors)
- J. Denis McGarry Award for Scientific/Community Excellence (ADA) – 2007
- Alpha Omega Alpha Robert J. Glaser Distinguished Teaching Award - 2008
