= Franz M. Matschinsky =

German-American scientist (1931–2022)

Franz Maximilian Matschinsky
- Born: July 17, 1931; Breslau, then Germany, now Wrocław, Poland
- Died: March 31, 2022 (aged 90); Wallingford, Pennsylvania
- Education: Herzog-Heinrich-Schule Liegnitz, Marien-Gymnasium Werl, LMU Munich (M.D. 1959), Max Planck Institute for Cell Biology, Ladenburg
- Known for: The role of hexokinase D in type 2 diabetes
- Spouse: Elke Fritz
- Children: 3
- Awards: Banting Medal of the American Diabetes Association
- Scientific career
- Fields: Medicine, biochemistry, pharmacology
- Workplaces: Washington University in St. Louis; University of Pennsylvania
- Thesis: On the mechanism of the Amanita phalloides toxin phalloidin (1959)
- Doctoral advisor: Heinrich Otto Wieland
- Other academic advisors: Feodor Lynen; Oliver H. Lowry

Franz Maximilian Matschinsky (July 17, 1931 – March 31, 2022) was a German-American medical doctor, pharmacologist, and biochemist. He conducted research in the field of insulin secretion and diabetes therapy.

== Life ==
Franz M. Matschinsky was born on July 17, 1931, in Breslau, then Germany. He initially grew up in the village of Rothbrünnig Kreis Goldberg (today Brennik, Złotoryja County) in Silesia, where his parents managed a farm. He attended the municipal high school Herzog-Heinrich-Schule in Liegnitz until 1945. In 1946, as a result of the expulsion after the Second World War, the family ended up in the village of Westönnen near Werl (Soest district) in the British Zone of what was later West-Germany. Matschinsky continued his schooling at the Marien-Gymnasium Werl, where he graduated in 1953.

Matschinsky received a BS in Basic Medical Science from the Albert Ludwig University (1953-1955) and then moved to LMU Munich (1955-1959). He received his M.D. in 1959 under Heinrich Otto Wieland on the topic of "On the mechanism of the Amanita phalloides toxin phalloidin". During his studies, he spent about one year under Feodor Lynen's personal supervision at the Max Planck Institute of Cell Chemistry in Munich (1955/1956) as a scholarship holder of the German Studienstiftung.

Two years as a postdoctoral fellow in Wieland's laboratory were followed by a period as a medical intern at the Marienhospital in Hagen (1961-1963). During this time he married Elke Fritz to whom he was married until her death in 2019. The couple had a daughter and two sons. Shortly after the birth of their first child, he continued his scientific training with Oliver H. Lowry in the department of pharmacology at Washington University School of Medicine in St. Louis, Missouri, United States (1963-1965). At this university, he was then Assistant (1965-1968), Associate (1968-1972), and Full Professor of Pharmacology (1972-1978).

In 1978, he moved to Perelman School of Medicine at the University of Pennsylvania, where he became director of the diabetes center (until 1998) and professor of biochemistry and biophysics. During this time, he was also full professor of these subjects at the school of medicine (1984-1993).

He was active in research and teaching until his retirement in 2021. He died on March 31, 2022, at his home in Wallingford near Philadelphia.

== Research ==
After moving to the US he studied the metabolism of the insulin-producing pancreatic islets and ultimately discovered the essential role of glucokinase (liver and pancreas hexokinase) in the regulation of glucose-stimulated insulin secretion. In subsequent studies, Matschinsky illuminated a role for manipulation of glucokinase in correcting metabolic defects in human pancreatic islet cells and other tissues involved in type 2 diabetes. Current knowledge on the role of glucokinase in the β cell and its misfunction causing diabetes is to a large extent based on work conducted by Matschinsky over the years. He published over 300 papers over his career. He was editor-in-chief of Diabetes (2002 - 2006).

== Awards ==
He has received several awards for his research in the field of insulin secretion and diabetes therapy:

- 1988 IDF Medal of the International Diabetes Federation
- 1992 Elliott Proctor Joslin Medal
- 1994 Banting Medal
- 1996 Paul Langerhans Medal
- 2011 Paul Lacy Medal
- 2020 Rolf Luft Award
