= William Muhlberg =

American physician

William Muhlberg (April 8, 1875, in Cincinnati, Ohio – April 5, 1962, in Cincinnati, Ohio) was an American physician, physiologist, and medical director for the Union Central Life Insurance Company. He was awarded the 1942 Banting Medal of the American Diabetes Association.

== Biography ==
William Muhlberg graduated in 1893 from Cincinnati's Woodward High School and then attended the University of Cincinnati. In 1897 he graduated from the Medical College of Ohio, which became the University of Cincinnati College of Medicine. For a year and a half from 1897 to 1898 he was a medical intern at Cincinnati's City Hospital, which became part of the University of Cincinnati Academic Health Center. For the academic year 1897–1898 he studied physiology in Bern, Switzerland. He also did postgraduate work in Vienna and Berlin. For the academic year 1899–1900 he was an assistant in the laboratory of physiology of Harvard Medical School, where he worked with William Townsend Porter. For some time Muhlberg was a pathologist at Cincinnati's Deaconess German Hospital. He was a professor of physiology at Medical College of Ohio from 1901 to 1907, when he resigned his professorship.

At Union Central Life Insurance Company, Muhlberg was assistant medical director from 1907 to 1916 and medical director from 1916 until his retirement. On June 7, 1942, in Haddon Hall in Atlantic City, New Jersey, he delivered the Banting Memorial Lecture entitled An Analysis of Statistics Bearing on Diabetes Mellitus.

In 1904 in Idaho Springs, Colorado he married Edna Zinke. Their daughter Edna was born in 1910 in Cincinnati.

== Selected publications ==
- Porter, W. T.; Muhlberg, W. (November 1, 1900). "Experiments concerning the prolonged inhibition said to follow injury of the spinal cord". American Journal of Physiology. 4 (7). doi:10.1152/ajplegacy.1900.4.7.334.
- Association of Life Insurance Medical Directors of America (1915). "A few practical observations—the result of 8000 examinations of urine by Dr. William Muhlberg". Transactions of the Annual Meeting, volume 3. New York: The Knickerbocker Press. pp. 183–193.
- Behre, Jeanette Allen; Muhlberg, William (May 1926). "Urinary preservatives including hexamethylenamine". The Journal of Laboratory and Clinical Medicine. 11 (8): 785–790.
- Behre, Jeanette Allen; Muhlberg, William (June 1926). "Permanent standards to be used with Benedict's "clinical quantitative test" for sugar in urine". The Journal of Laboratory and Clinical Medicine. 11 (9): 887–888.
- Muhlberg, W.; Allen, F.; Marquette, B. (1930). Life Conservation Studies. Cardio Vascular Lesions among One Thousand Industrial Machine Operators. A Report of One Thousand Physical Examinations of Machine Operators.
