= George Eisenbarth =

American diabetologist (1947–2012)

- Born: George Stephen Eisenbarth; September 17, 1947; Brooklyn, New York, U.S.
- Died: November 13, 2012 (aged 65)
- Occupation: Diabetologist
- Known for: Autoimmune basis of the disease

George Stephen Eisenbarth (September 17, 1947 – November 13, 2012) was an American diabetologist who specialized in type 1 diabetes. He helped to establish the autoimmune basis of the disease.

== Early life and education ==
Eisenbarth was born in 1947 in Brooklyn, New York, to a German-American family. His father worked at the American Museum of Natural History and neither of his parents had completed high school. He attended Grover Cleveland High School, graduating in 1965, and received a scholarship to enroll at Columbia University. He completed a BA at Columbia in 1969 before moving to Duke University to complete a PhD in 1974 and an MD in 1975. As an endocrinology research fellow under Harold Lebovitz at Duke, he ran a study that demonstrated the association between human leukocyte antigen and autoimmune polyendocrine syndrome type 2.

== Career ==
Eisenbarth developed an interest in type 1 diabetes, and the possibility that it is caused by autoimmunity, while working at the National Institutes of Health in Marshall Warren Nirenberg's laboratory. He moved to the Joslin Diabetes Center in 1982 to continue his research into type 1 diabetes. Here he conducted twin studies showing that when one of a pair of identical twins had diabetes, the unaffected twin would also go on to develop diabetes if they had autoantibodies against the insulin-producing pancreatic beta cells—thus demonstrating the insidious and progressive autoimmune origins of the disease. He produced a frequently used graph depicting the development of type 1 diabetes in those who were genetically predisposed. In an obituary, Mark Atkinson wrote of Eisenbarth's graph, "it would be my contention that no concept in the modern history of type 1 diabetes has been more recognized, plagiarized, conceptualized, questioned or tested than 'the figure'", which was first published in 1986 in The New England Journal of Medicine. Michael Appel, of the U.S. National Institute of Diabetes and Digestive and Kidney Diseases, humorously referred to it as a "George graph" and commented that "it became the most over-shown graph ever".

In 1992, Eisenbarth was appointed to chairs of pediatrics and immunology at the University of Colorado Anschutz, and also became the executive director of the Barbara Davis Center for Diabetes; he would remain there for twenty years, until his death. He received numerous honors from the American Diabetes Association, including the Outstanding Scientific Achievement Award (1986), the Banting Medal (2009), and the Albert Renold Award (2012). He also received the JDRF David Rumbough Scientific Award (1997), the JDRF Mary Tyler Moore and S. Robert Levine Excellence in Clinical Research Award (2012), and the Pasteur–Weizmann/Servier Prize in Biomedicine (2006). In 2013, the JDRF established a new award: the George Eisenbarth Award for Type 1 Diabetes Prevention.

== Death ==
After being diagnosed with pancreatic cancer in 2010, Eisenbarth underwent a total pancreatectomy and developed insulin-dependent diabetes. He died at the age of 65 on November 13, 2012.
