= Narayana Panicker Kochupillai =

Indian clinical endocrinologist

- Born: 10 February 1939 (age 87); Kerala, India
- Occupation: Endocrinologist
- Known for: Endocrinology
- Awards: Padma Shri; Dr. B. C. Roy Award; Ranbaxy International Award; ESI Lifetime Achievement Award; Andhra Pradesh Diabetes Association Medal; SGPGIMS FESTA Award; INSA Shree Dhanwantari Prize

Narayana Panicker Kochupillai, popularly known as N. P. Kochupillai, is an Indian clinical endocrinologist, Professor Emeritus of the National Academy of Medical Sciences and a former head of the department of Endocrinology and Metabolism at the All India Institute of Medical Sciences, New Delhi, known to have contributed to the understanding of endemically prevalent endocrine and metabolic disorders. A winner of 2002 Dr. B. C. Roy Award, he was honoured by the Government of India in 2003 with Padma Shri, the fourth highest Indian civilian award.

== Biography ==
Narayana Panicker Kochupillai was born in the South Indian state of Kerala on 10 February 1939. He graduated in science (BSc) from the University of Kerala and secured his graduate (MBBS) and masters (MD) medical degrees from the All India Institute of Medical Sciences (AIIMS), New Delhi. His advanced residency on Immunoassay technology was completed at Icahn School of Medicine at Mount Sinai, New York under Dr. Rosalyn S. Yalow. His career started at AIIMS as a member of faculty and as a consultant endocrinologist where he rose to become the head of the department of endocrinology and metabolism. An Emeritus Professor of the National Academy of Medical Sciences (NAMS), Kochupillai is a former president of the Endocrine Society of India and is the Director of Medical Research at M. S. Ramaiah Medical College, Bengaluru.

Kochupillai is reported to have over 35 years of research and teaching experience. He is considered by many as a tertiary care specialist and his researches on internal medicine and clinical endocrinology are known to have assisted the medical fraternity to have a better understanding of the endemically prevalent endocrine and metabolic disorders. His researches have been documented by way of over 145 medical research papers published in peer reviewed journals and he has mentored many masters and doctoral students in their studies. He has also conducted several medical conferences and has delivered keynote addresses.

Kochupillai, a Solomon A. Berson International Fellow, is an elected fellow of the Indian National Science Academy (FNA), Indian Academy of Sciences (FASc) and the National Academy of Medical Sciences (FAMS). He received the Ranbaxy International Award in 1999 followed by Dr. B. C. Roy Award, the highest Indian award in the medical category, in 2002. The Government of India honoured him again in 2003 with the civilian award of Padma Shri. He is a recipient of Andhra Pradesh Diabetes Association Medal in 2004, Endocrine Society of India Lifetime Achievement Award in 2005, FESTA Award of Sanjay Gandhi Post Graduate Institute of Medical Sciences in 2005 and Shree Dhanwantari Prize of Indian National Science Academy in 2009. He has also delivered many award lectures such as Endocrine Society of India Annual Oration, Nutrition Society of India Srikantia Memorial Oration, ISCA Platinum Jubilee Lecture, ISCA Guha Memorial Oration and Uttar Pradesh Diabetes Association Sircar Oration.

== See also ==
- Endocrinology
- Metabolism
