= Robert Hardin Williams =

American physician

Robert Hardin Williams (September 27, 1909, Savannah, Tennessee – November 4, 1979) was a physician, specializing in endocrinology and diabetology. He was the 49th President of The Endocrine Society.

== Biography ==
After growing up and graduating from high school in Savannah, Tennessee, Robert H. Williams graduated with a bachelor's degree in 1929 from Washington and Lee University and an M.D. in 1934 from Johns Hopkins School of Medicine. He was from 1934 to 1935 a medical intern in pathology at Boston City Hospital, where he was mentored in endocrinology by Fuller Albright and James Howard Means. From 1935 to 1937, Williams completed his medical training and residency in internal medicine at Vanderbilt University Hospital, which became Vanderbilt University Medical Center (VUMC). He was from 1937 to 1938 an instructor at the Johns Hopkins School of Medicine and from 1938 to 1939 worked at the Vanderbilt University School of Medicine. At Harvard Medical School he was from 1939 to 1940 a fellow, from 1940 to 1944 an instructor, from 1944 to 1946 a medical associate, and from 1946 to 1948 an assistant professor. In 1948 he resigned from Harvard Medical School to become the chair of the department medicine at the newly established University of Washington School of Medicine; he was the chair from 1948 to 1963 during the department's formative period.

Dr. Williams conducted his early work on thyroid disorders. His later research concentrated on diabetes, particularly insulin secretion and metabolism and its interaction with other hormonal substances. Dr. Williams established the Diabetes Research Institute and the Diabetes Center at the University of Washington. He also studied problems of obesity, atherosclerosis, and lipid metabolism.

He was the editor of Textbook of Endocrinology (W. B. Saunders, 1950) with a second edition in 1955 and many subsequent editions. The Williams Textbook of Endocrinology, 14th revised edition, was published in 2020. He was the editor of, and wrote seven chapters for, the 1973 book To Live and Die: When, Why, and How, "which addressed the issues of euthanasia, suicide, population planning, organ transplantation, body-mind-soul interrelations, and the afterlife."

In 1966 Williams was awarded the Banting Medal of the American Diabetes Association.

He married in 1941 and became the father of several children.

== Selected publications ==
- Williams, Robert H. (1943). "Clinical biotin deficiency". New England Journal of Medicine. 228 (8): 247–252. doi:10.1056/NEJM194302252280802.
- Williams, Robert H.; Weinglass, Albert R.; Bissell, Grosvenor W.; Peters, Jean B. (1944). "Anatomical Effects of Thiouracil". Endocrinology. 34 (5): 317–328. doi:10.1210/endo-34-5-317.
- Lloyd, Charles W.; Williams, Robert H. (1948). "Endocrine changes associated with Laennec's cirrhosis of the liver". The American Journal of Medicine. 4 (3): 315–330. doi:10.1016/0002-9343(48)90248-4. PMID 18904051.
- Daughaday, William H.; Jaffe, Herbert; Williams, Robert H. (1948). "Chemical Assay for "Cortin"". The Journal of Clinical Endocrinology & Metabolism. 8 (2): 166–174. doi:10.1210/jcem-8-2-166. PMID 18907982.
- Lee, Norman D.; Williams, Robert H. (1952). "The Role of the Pituitary-Adrenal System in Cystine-S^{35} Incorporation into Protein". Endocrinology. 51 (5): 451–456. doi:10.1210/endo-51-5-451. PMID 13010200.
- Lee, Norman D.; Williams, Robert H. (1954). "The Intracellular Localization of Labeled Thyroxine and Labeled Insulin in Mammalian Liver". Endocrinology. 54 (1): 5–19. doi:10.1210/endo-54-1-5. PMID 13151087.
- Vanarsdel, Paul; Hogness, John R.; Williams, Robert H.; Elgee, Neil (1954). "Comparative Distribution and Fate of I^{131}-Labeled Thyroxine and Triiodothyronine". Endocrinology. 55 (3): 332–343. doi:10.1210/endo-55-3-332. PMID 13200442.
- Williams RH (1954). "The clinical investigator and his role in teaching, administration, and the care of the patient". Journal of the American Medical Association. 156 (2): 127–136. PMID 13191939.
- Cox, Robert W.; Henley, Elaine D.; Narahara, Hiromichi T.; Vanarsdel, Paul P.; Williams, Robert H. (1957). "Studies on the Metabolism of Glucagon-I^{131} in Rats". Endocrinology. 60 (2): 277–284. doi:10.1210/endo-60-2-277. PMID 13397495.
- Narahara, H. T.; Williams, Robert H. (1957). "Degradation of Glucagon-I^{131} by Rat Tissues in Vitro". Endocrinology. 60 (2): 285–289. doi:10.1210/endo-60-2-285. PMID 13397496.
- Steiner, Donald F.; Rauda, Vija; Williams, Robert H. (1961). "Severe Ketoacidosis in the Alloxan Diabetic Rat". Endocrinology. 68 (5): 809–817. doi:10.1210/endo-68-5-809.
- Longcope, Christopher; Williams, Robert H. (1963). "Esterification of Cholesterol by Homogenates of Rat Adrenal Tissue". Endocrinology. 72 (5): 735–741. doi:10.1210/endo-72-5-735.
- Porte Jr., Daniel; Williams, Robert H. (1966). "Inhibition of Insulin Release by Norepinephrine in Man". Science. 152 (3726): 1248–1250. Bibcode:1966Sci...152.1248P. doi:10.1126/science.152.3726.1248. PMID 5327883. S2CID 39143811.
- Solomon, Solomon S.; Poffenbarger, Phillip L.; Hepp, Dieter K.; Fenster, L. Frederick; Ensinck, John W.; Williams, Robert H. (1967). "Quantitation and Partial Characterization of Nonsuppressible Insulin-like Activity in Serum and Tissue Extracts of the Rat". Endocrinology. 81 (2): 213–225. doi:10.1210/endo-81-2-213. PMID 4952847.
- Lavis, Victor R.; Ensinck, John W.; Williams, Robert H. (1970). "Effects of Insulin and Proinsulin on Isolated Fat Cells and Hemidiaphragms from Rats". Endocrinology. 87 (1): 135–142. doi:10.1210/endo-87-1-135. PMID 5445361.
- Stoll, R. W.; Touber, J. L.; Winterscheid, L. C.; Ensinck, J. W.; Williams, R. H. (1971). "Hypoglycemic Activity and Immunological Half-life of Porcine Insulin and Proinsulin in Baboons and Swine". Endocrinology. 88 (3): 714–717. doi:10.1210/endo-88-3-714. PMID 5541306.
- Rall, L. B.; Pictet, R. L.; Williams, R. H.; Rutter, W. J. (1973). "Early Differentiation of Glucagon-Producing Cells in Embryonic Pancreas: A Possible Developmental Role for Glucagon". Proceedings of the National Academy of Sciences. 70 (12): 3478–3482. Bibcode:1973PNAS...70.3478R. doi:10.1073/pnas.70.12.3478. PMC 427263. PMID 4519640.
- Dudl, R. James; Ensinck, John W.; Palmer, H. Earl; Williams, Robert H. (1973). "Effect of Age on Growth Hormone Secretion in Man". The Journal of Clinical Endocrinology & Metabolism. 37 (1): 11–16. doi:10.1210/jcem-37-1-11. PMID 4715288.
- Hayes, J. R.; Johnson, D. G.; Koerker, D.; Williams, R. H. (1975). "Inhibition of Gastrin Release by Somatostatin in Vitro". Endocrinology. 96 (6): 1374–1376. doi:10.1210/endo-96-6-1374. PMID 1126310.
- Hayes, J. R.; Williams, R. H. (1975). "The Effect on Gastrin Secretion of Agents which Increase the Intracellular Concentration of 3′,5′-Adenosine Monophosphate". Endocrinology. 97 (5): 1210–1214. doi:10.1210/endo-97-5-1210. PMID 171147.
