= Roger Unger =

American physician (1924–2020)

Roger H. Unger
- Born: March 7, 1924; New York City
- Died: August 22, 2020 (aged 96); Dallas, Texas
- Education: Yale University, Columbia University (MD)
- Occupation: Physician
- Known for: Studies of the physiology of pancreatic islets, development of the first radioimmunoassay for glucagon
- Spouse: Marlise
- Children: 4
- Relatives: Harlow Giles Unger (brother)
- Awards: Lilly Award (1964); Banting Medal (1975); Fred Conrad Koch Award (1983); Rolf Luft Award (2014)

Roger H. Unger (March 7, 1924 – August 22, 2020) was an American physician known for his studies of the physiology of pancreatic islets. In particular the elucidation of the roles of insulin and glucagon in the regulation of normal blood glucose homeostasis and in the pathogenesis of diabetes, and the establishment of glucagon as a hormone. He was the Touchstone/West Distinguished Chair in Diabetes Research at University of Texas Southwestern Medical Center.

== Early life and education ==
Unger was born March 7, 1924, to parents who were a physician/hematologist and a stay-at-home mother respectively. He grew up in New York City, attending the Horace Mann School until the age of 15, then the Taft School for the rest of his secondary education. Unger completed his undergraduate studies at Yale University, then his medical degree at Columbia University.

== Medical and research career ==
Following medical school, Unger worked at New York's Bellevue Hospital. In 1951, he joined the US Public Health Service, where he directed a diabetes detection drive. In 1956, Unger began his research career by joining the faculty of the University of Texas Southwestern Medical Center and the Dallas VA Medical Center. He turned his attention first to glucagon, then a protein of unknown function known to be secreted by pancreatic islets. With the help of Solomon Berson's lab, Unger's group developed a radioimmunoassay for measuring glucagon levels, which they published in 1959. Over the subsequent decades, Unger's group continued to delve into glucagon's role in controlling blood sugar, as well as how glucagon secretion is regulated. He is known for advocating the "bihormonal hypothesis", that blood sugar is regulated by the opposing actions of insulin and glucagon, and that the disease diabetes is caused both by lack of insulin, and unopposed glucagon.

In 1986 Unger, Daniel Foster, and J. Denis McGarry founded the Touchstone Diabetes Center at UT Southwestern, which Unger directed from 1987 until 2007.

Roger Unger's research accomplishments were recognized by several honors in his lifetime. He was appointed to the US National Academy of Sciences in 1986, and the American Academy of Arts and Sciences in 1994.
