= Louis Harry Newburgh =

American physician and medical educator (1883–1956)

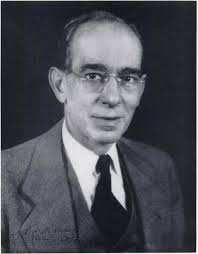
- Born: June 17, 1883; Cincinnati, Ohio
- Died: July 17, 1956 (aged 73)
- Spouse: Irene Haskell

Louis Harry Newburgh (June 17, 1883 – July 17, 1956) was an American physician and medical educator. He spent most of his career teaching and researching at the University of Michigan. Newburgh was involved in many early experiments and discoveries with obesity and renal diseases. He made significant contributions to the field with his level of meticulousness and detail to the scientific method.

== Early life and education ==
Newburgh was born on June 17, 1883, in Cincinnati, Ohio. His father had desires to become a doctor but became a local businessman in the tobacco industry to support his family. Louis Newburgh attended Harvard in 1901 and received his BA and then his MD from Harvard Medical School in 1908. He studied abroad in Vienna in Hans Eppinger's clinics to return and start his career in clinical investigations. In Boston, he published papers and began his journey into dietetics.

After Boston, in 1916, he accepted a full-time position as assistant professor at Internal Medicine at the University of Michigan Medical School.

== Medical and professional career ==
In 1918, Dr. Newburgh was promoted to Associate Professor and then Clinical Investigation Professor in 1922. During this time, Newburg started to develop an interest in the renal system, diet, and how fluids and electrolytes work in the body. He also had a great interest in the treatment of Type I Diabetes before the use of insulin. Prior to Newburgh, starvation was one of the treatments. Newburgh found that a low-carbohydrate diet made up of mostly fat intake helped individuals regain a degree of normalcy. The diet was called “The Newburgh Four.” The diet soon became obsolete due to the discovery and use of insulin. Newburgh also took part in the early testing of high protein diets and their effects on renal function.

Some of Newburgh’s greatest contributions were in the area of heat loss and energy measurement. Dr. Newburgh was unique in his attention to detail, specifically regarding fluid loss in investigated subjects. These measurements and details lead to a greater understanding of energy use in humans. He contributed to theories and solutions on topics ranging from obesity to nephritis and diabetes using chambers or meticulous collections of fluids lost from individuals. Some of his conclusions and experiments are still important today to solve and understand these science curiosities.

== Awards and recognition ==
During World War II, Newburgh participated in the testing and creation of clothing for serving military men. Due to his research in body heat and energy conservation, he contributed to solutions and ideas that helped keep men safe from hypothermia in the water. He also helped determine general daily wear and what would contribute to clothing protection and breathability. For his work to the country, he was awarded the Certificate of Merit.

Due to the important role Newburgh played in diabetes research and contributions to many nutrition and medical journals, Newburgh received the Banting Medal posthumous in 1956.

== Personal life ==
Louis Harry Newburgh married Irene Haskell in 1912. During their marriage, they had two sons— Henry, born in 1915, and then son John David who was born in 1920. Henry became an Electrical Engineer. John David was an exceptional math and science student who sadly had repeated health bouts with Ulcerative Colitis and eventually passed in 1953. The death of his son greatly affected Newburgh, and he died a few years later, in 1956.

Newburgh also loved horticulture and spent much time with his family and friends maintaining or socializing in his gardens.

== Selected publications ==
- The Use of a High Fat Diet in the Treatment of Diabetes Mellitus (1920)
