= Mark Atkinson (scientist) =

American medical researcher (born 1961)

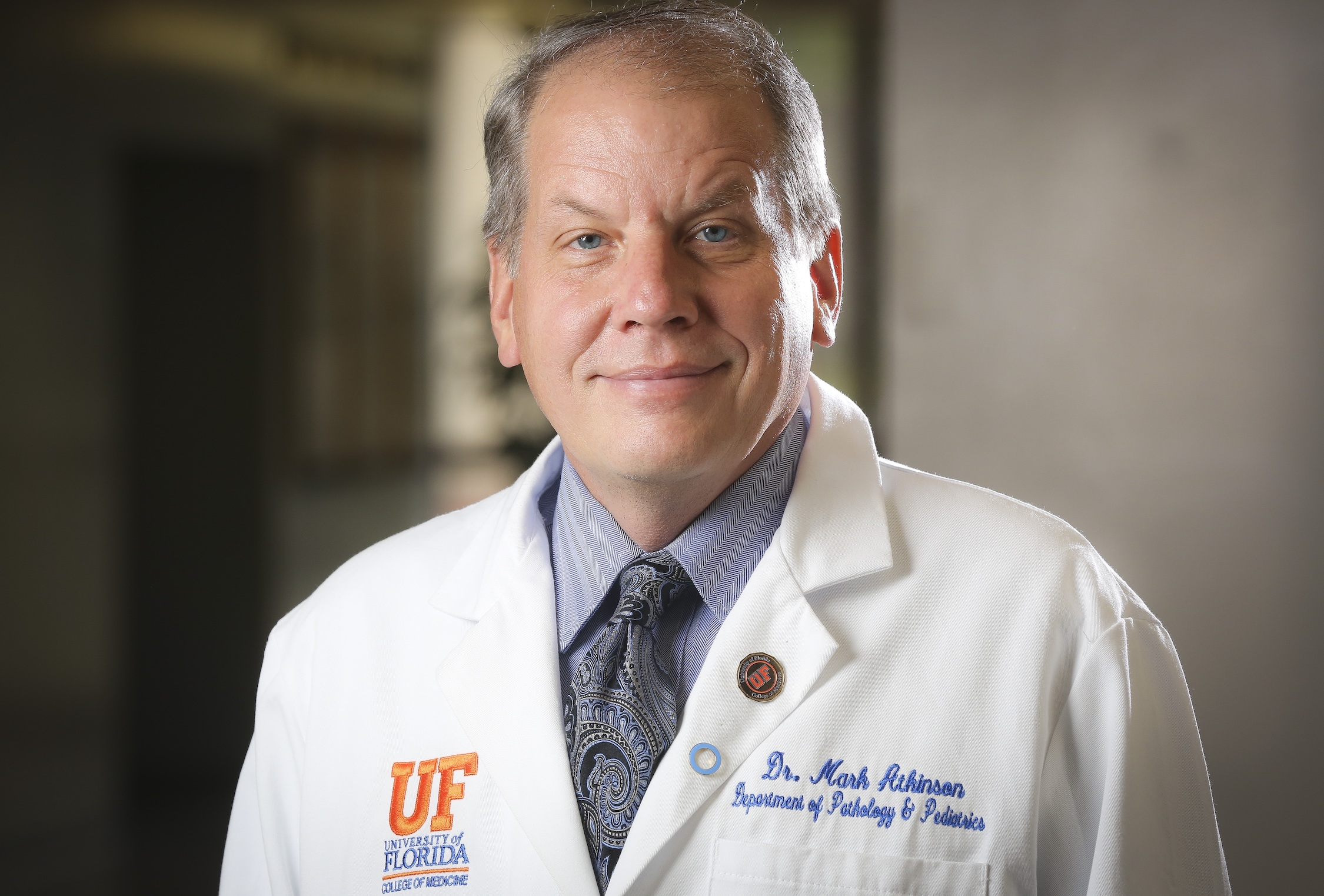
- Born: March 27, 1961 (age 65); Dearborn, Michigan
- Education: University of Michigan–Dearborn (B.S.); University of Florida (Ph.D.)
- Known for: Type 1 diabetes research / humanitarian efforts
- Scientific career
- Fields: Medical research, pathology, type 1 diabetes, clinical trials
- Workplaces: University of Florida College of Medicine

Mark Atkinson (born March 27, 1961) is an American medical researcher best known for his contributions to research seeking to predict, prevent, and cure type 1 diabetes. He is the author of over 600 publications and one of the world's most cited diabetes researchers.

Atkinson conducts research at the University of Florida College of Medicine, where he is director for the Diabetes Institute at UF Health. He is also the executive director of the Network for Pancreatic Organ donors with Diabetes (nPOD) program.

Atkinson has also been cited for his humanitarian contributions, particularly his efforts to improve diabetes care, management, and access to medications and supplies in developing nations.

== Early life and education ==
Mark Atkinson was born and raised in southeastern Michigan. He attended the University of Michigan – Dearborn, where he received a bachelor of Science in microbiology in 1983. Atkinson next received a Ph.D. from the Department of Pathology at the University of Florida in 1987.

While at the University of Florida, Atkinson’s interest in type 1 diabetes started by volunteering at a summer camp for children with the disease. Those efforts led Atkinson to develop his three career goals of determining what causes type 1 diabetes, identifying a means to predict T1D, and developing a way to prevent and cure the disease.

== Career ==
Atkinson has been teaching and conducting research in the Departments of Pathology and Pediatrics at the University of Florida College of Medicine since 1988. He is the American Diabetes Association Eminent Scholar for Diabetes Research and the Jeffrey Keene Family Professor at the University of Florida, as well as the Director for the Diabetes Institute at that institution.

Atkinson is the Executive Director for the Network for Pancreatic Organ donors with Diabetes (nPOD) program, the world's largest "open access" biobank of human tissues from persons with or at varying levels of risk for type 1 diabetes. nPOD is funded by JDRF and The Leona M. and Harry B. Helmsley Charitable Trust. Through nPOD, Atkinson and other collaborators support research utilizing transplant-grade human tissues obtained from organ donors, including pancreas, spleen, whole blood, serum, lymph nodes, pancreatic lymph nodes, thymus, skin and bone marrow. The goal is to better understand the causes of type 1 diabetes and identify potential approaches to curing the disease. Atkinson has directed nPOD since its founding in 2007, and it has continued to support over 320 research projects in over 20 countries worldwide.[5]

Atkinson is the author of over 600 peer-reviewed publications as well as several book chapters. Expertscape ranks Atkinson as one of the ten most published diabetes researchers in the world, and with an all-time h-index of 91, he is one of the most highly cited diabetes researchers in the world.

Atkinson provides administrative or advisory services to JDRF, the American Diabetes Association, Diapedia, the National Institutes of Health (NIH), and the Immunology of Diabetes Society. He is a charter member of the NIH's Immune Tolerance Network Scientific Advisory Board, former Chair of the NIH's Human Islet Research Network (HIRN), and a steering committee member of NIH TrialNet.

Atkinson formerly was an Associate Editor for the journal Diabetes. He is ad hoc Editor-in-Chief for that journal as well as Diabetes Care.

Atkinson is pursuing a vaccine strategy for preventing type 1 diabetes. The approach seeks to eliminate the autoimmune response directed at insulin that is present in patients with the disease by generating antigen-specific Tregs (regulatory T cells) in response to the antigens of interest, rather than trying to eliminate the autoreactive, destructive cells. To further this line of research, Atkinson and other investigators started a spin-off company called OneVax, LLC. OneVax seeks to develop and commercialize a novel vaccine formula to prevent and/or reverse type 1 diabetes, incorporating biomaterials and polymers for applications including multicomponent and time-release drug delivery. Atkinson is CEO of OneVax.

== Research ==
Atkinson's research activities have a broad scope, but most fall under the umbrella of preventing and curing type 1 diabetes. Specific areas of focus include disease prediction, the role of environment in the initiation of type 1 diabetes, stem cells and beta cell regeneration, pancreatic pathology, clinical trials seeking to prevent or reverse type 1 diabetes, the identification of markers of immunological tolerance, and devising ways to instill proper immunoregulation. Atkinson has been the recipient of funding awards from entities such as the National Institutes of Health, JDRF, the American Diabetes Association, and the Leona M. and Harry B. Helmsley Charitable Trust.

Atkinson has conducted numerous studies that take different approaches to predicting, preventing, and curing type 1 diabetes. His earliest efforts focused on the use of autoantibodies, both anti-insulin and anti-glutamic acid decarboxylase (GAD), for that purpose. He was also amongst the first to describe cellular immune responses against GAD in both humans and the NOD mouse model of type 1 diabetes. He has extensively utilized NOD mice as a means to identify agents that could be translated to studies seeking to prevent or reverse type 1 diabetes, but at the same time, has stated that such efforts need to be approached with caution. His publication in the journal Nature Medicine noting the nearly 200 ways to prevent diabetes in that animal model elicited mixed responses from the research community.

Atkinson was one of the first to propose “combination therapies” to prevent or reverse the disease, as well as the repurposing of existing treatments and agents already approved for other diseases and conditions. Atkinson has led or contributed to clinical trials utilizing several types of interventions to stop the progression of or reverse type 1 diabetes, including prophylactic insulin, GAD, cord blood, cord blood plus Omega-3 FA, granulocyte colony-stimulating factor (GCSF), and anti-thymocyte globulin (ATG) plus GCSF.

For more than 25 years, Atkinson led an NIH-funded clinical research program aiming to assess immune function during different stages of type 1 diabetes. The goal is to learn more about the genetics and immune function of blood cells, diet, and viruses and how they relate to the progression of T1D.

Atkinson is also active in studies assessing the human intestinal microbiome, pancreatic pathology, human pancreatic weight and beta cell development, as well as improving methods of data management.

=== Collaborations ===
In addition to nPOD, Atkinson participates in a number of other collaborative research efforts. He is one of ten members of the Brehm Coalition for Type 1 Diabetes Research, and one of four initial members of the Leona M. and Harry B. Helmsley Charitable Trust's Type 1 Diabetes Research Initiative. Atkinson also collaborates on a number of research initiatives with investigators in the US and abroad as well as with his colleagues at the University of Florida's Diabetes Institute.

Atkinson is director of the Human Biomolecular Atlas Program (HuBMAP) at the University of Florida. HuBMAP is working to develop a 3-D map of the human body at a single-cell level.

== Honors and awards ==
- 2004: Mary Tyler Moore and S. Robert Levine, M.D. Excellence in Clinical Research Award from JDRF
- 2016: Outstanding Alumni of the Year Award from The University of Michigan-Dearborn
- 2018: University of Florida College of Medicine Lifetime Achievement Award
- 2018: American Diabetes Association Humanitarian Award
- 2018: American Diabetes Association Albert Renold Award
- 2018: In December 2018 Expertscape recognized Atkinson as one of the top ten experts in the world for expertise in Diabetes Mellitus Type 1.
- 2019: Novo Nordisk Jacobæus Award

== Philanthropy ==
Atkinson has joined with other leaders calling for a means to provide insulin to 100 percent of the world's population who need it by 2022, the centennial anniversary of insulin availability. Atkinson also is an Advisory Board Member to the Life for a Child program.

Atkinson has worked with the Haitian Foundation for Diabetes and Cardiovascular Diseases (Fondation Haitienne de Diabete et de Maladies Cardio-Vasculaires), overseen by Nancy Larco. Atkinson has traveled to Haiti to provide medical, dental, and educational assistance, including after the 2010 Haiti earthquake.

Atkinson and his wife co-founded a non-profit organization, Hope on the Move, for humanitarian causes, primarily related to providing medical and dental care to developing nations. Atkinson is secretary, treasurer and director of Hope on the Move.

Atkinson is the president of Insulin for Life-USA, a non-profit organization that collects insulin, test strips, and other diabetes management supplies and distributes them to needy individuals in developing nations as well as in the United States following natural disasters.

== Selected publications ==
- Atkinson, MA; Eisenbarth, GS; Michels, AW (2014). "Type 1 diabetes". The Lancet. 383 (9911): 69–82. doi:10.1016/S0140-6736(13)60591-7. PMC 4380133. PMID 23890997.
- Pugliese, A; Yang, M; Kusmarteva, I; Heiple, T; Vendrame, F; Wasserfall, C; Rowe, P; Moraski, JM; Ball, S; Jebson, L; Schatz, DA; Gianani, R; Burke, GW; Nierras, C; Staeva, T; Kaddis, JS; Campbell-Thompson, M; Atkinson, MA (2014). "The Juvenile Diabetes Research Foundation Network for Pancreatic Organ Donors with Diabetes (nPOD) Program: goals, operational model and emerging findings". Pediatric Diabetes. 15 (1): 1–9. doi:10.1111/pedi.12097. PMC 4282794. PMID 24325575.
- Atkinson, MA; Ogle, GD (December 2013). "Improving diabetes care in resource-poor countries: challenges and opportunities". The Lancet Diabetes & Endocrinology. 1 (4): 268–70. doi:10.1016/S2213-8587(13)70172-4. PMID 24622408.
- Staeva, TP; Chatenoud, L; Insel, R; Atkinson, MA (January 2013). "Recent lessons learned from prevention and recent-onset type 1 diabetes immunotherapy trials". Diabetes. 62 (1): 9–17. doi:10.2337/db12-0562. PMC 3526042. PMID 23258904.
- Atkinson, MA (August 2011). "Evaluating preclinical efficacy". Science Translational Medicine. 3 (96): 22. doi:10.1126/scitranslmed.3002757. PMID 21849661.
