= William C. Stadie =

William Christopher Stadie (June 15, 1886 – September 12, 1959) was a researcher, a Diabetes specialist. He was John Herr Musser Emeritus Professor of Research Medicine at the University of Pennsylvania. He also served as an editor of the Diabetes, the journal of the American Diabetes Association. Other distinctions included: honorary degree of the University of Pennsylvania, the Phillips Medal of the American College of Physicians (1941), the Kober Medal for 1955 from the Association of American Physicians and the Banting Medal of the American Diabetes Association. He was also elected to the United States National Academy of Sciences (1945) and the American Philosophical Society (1947). During the 1918 influenza epidemic Stadie invented oxygen therapy for treatment of cyanosis, a condition resulting from pneumonia.

== Career ==
Stadie graduated from New York University in 1907 and received his M.D. from Columbia University in 1916. He served in World War I in the United States Army Medical Corps. Stadie was part of the medical faculty at Yale University from 1921 to 1924. In 1924 he moved to the University of Pennsylvania as an associate professor. He was promoted to the Musser chair in 1941.
