= David Mangelsdorf =

American biologist and chemist (1958–2025)

David J. Mangelsdorf (July 22, 1958 – August 3, 2025) was an American biologist and chemist, the Alfred G. Gilman Distinguished Chair in Pharmacology, Raymond and Ellen Willie Distinguished Chair in Molecular Neuropharmacology at University of Texas Southwestern Medical Center. In 2008, he was elected to the National Academy of Sciences. He, along with Steven Kliewer, identified the ligands and physiologic functions of a number of orphan nuclear receptors that then discovered two new signaling pathways mediated by the endocrine factors FGF19 and FGF21, which has become a significant accomplishment in the field. He received BS degrees in biology and chemistry from Northern Arizona University in 1981 and a PhD in biochemistry from the University of Arizona in 1987. He was elected a Member of the National Academy of Medicine in 2024. Mangelsdorf died in Dallas, Texas, on August 3, 2025, at the age of 67.
