= Steven Kliewer =

American biochemist

Steven Kliewer is an American biochemist, a significant figure in his field, currently the Diana K. and Richard C. Strauss Distinguished Chair in Developmental Biology at University of Texas Southwestern Medical Center. In 2015, he was elected to the National Academy of Sciences. He, along with David Mangelsdorf, identified the ligands and physiologic functions of a number of orphan nuclear receptors that then discovered two new signaling pathways mediated by the endocrine factors FGF19 and FGF21, which has become a significant accomplishment in the field.
