= Intramyocellular lipids =

Intramyocellular lipids (or IMCL) are fats stored in droplets in muscle cells. They provide an important energy source for working muscle. During exercise, a large amount of circulating free fatty acids are directed into muscle cells for energy; during rest, incoming fatty acids are instead stored in the muscle cell as triglycerides for later burning. However, an increase in muscle insulin resistance, caused by obesity, diabetes mellitus type 2, and metabolic syndrome, will result in an excess accumulation of intramyocellular lipids.

== See also ==
Insulin glargine
