= Alexander Marble =

American diabetologist

Alexander Marble (February 2, 1902 – September 13, 1992) was an American diabetologist who spent the majority of his career at the Joslin Diabetes Center.

== Life and career ==
Marble was born in 1902 in Troy, Kansas. He attended the University of Kansas, completing a BA in chemistry in 1922 and an MA in bacteriology and immunology in 1924. He graduated from Harvard Medical School in 1927.

After graduating from Harvard, Marble interned at Johns Hopkins Hospital then returned to Boston to complete a residency at Massachusetts General Hospital. He was awarded a traveling fellowship in the early 1930s to study in Austria, Germany and England, including at the laboratory of Henry Hallett Dale. His research subjects at this time included pentosuria, glycosuria, xylose metabolism, and vitamin D. Upon his return to the United States in 1932, he was recruited by Elliott P. Joslin to join his diabetes clinic in Boston, where Marble was given his own laboratory and was appointed Director of Research. During his time at the Joslin Diabetes Center, Marble became known as an authority on the treatment of diabetic ketoacidosis. He later served as president of the Joslin Diabetes Center from 1967 to 1976. He was a professor of medicine at Harvard, and served as president of the American Diabetes Association and honorary president of the International Diabetes Federation. He received the Banting Medal of the American Diabetes Association in 1967.

During the Second World War, Marble served in the United States Army Medical Corps, first at Cape Cod and later as Chief of Medicine at Harmon General Hospital. After the conclusion of the war, he remained a consultant to the Army Reserve for another three decades, eventually being promoted to the rank of Brigadier General. While in the Army, he wrote a series of publications about tropical diseases such as malaria in returned servicemen.

He was married to Beula Marble, a dietitian and president of the American Dietetic Association, with whom he had one daughter. He died in 1992 in a retirement village in Bedford, Massachusetts. An obituary in Diabetes described Marble as one of "the giant trees among the diabetes sequoias".
