= David Kipnis =

American scientist

David Morris Kipnis (May 23, 1927 – February 5, 2014) was an American endocrinologist and medical researcher at Washington University in St. Louis. He discovered the "incretin effect".

== Life and career ==
Kipnis was born in Baltimore in 1927; his parents were immigrants from Eastern Europe. He first became interested in medicine as a young child when he would carry his local pediatrician's medical bag on house calls. After graduating from Johns Hopkins University at the age of 18, he was considered too young to enroll in medical school, so he joined the U.S. Army at Fort Leonard Wood before returning to Maryland. He completed his medical degree at the University of Maryland in 1950.

Following an internship at Johns Hopkins Hospital, residency at Duke University Hospital, and a chief resident position at the University of Maryland Medical Center, he moved to Washington University in St. Louis, where he would spend the remainder of his career. His first position at the university in 1955 was a research fellow with Nobel laureates Gerty Cori and Carl Ferdinand Cori. He founded Washington University's Clinical Research Center in 1960 and was its director until 1987. He became a full professor in 1965 and was made head of the Department of Medicine in 1973. During the 1980s, he forged a deal with Monsanto to collaborate on medical research with Monsanto providing US$100 million in funding over two decades. He was also physician-in-chief at Barnes Hospital.

Kipnis's own research focused on diabetes and metabolism. He discovered the "incretin effect"—demonstrating that consuming sugar and other carbohydrates by mouth leads the gut to release hormones that promote the release of insulin—which was the foundation for a new class of drugs to treat diabetes. He also studied the regulation of insulin release by the pancreas and the transport mechanisms of glucose and amino acids in the body.

== Honors ==
The American Diabetes Association awarded Kipnis its Banting Medal in 1977 and the Association of American Physicians awarded him its George M. Kober Medal in 1994. He was elected to the National Academy of Medicine in 1974, the American Academy of Arts and Sciences in 1974, and the National Academy of Sciences in 1981.
