= Ora Mendelsohn Rosen =

American medical researcher

- Born: October 26, 1935; Manhattan, New York, United States
- Died: May 30, 1990 (aged 54); Manhattan, New York
- Education: Barnard College; Columbia Medical School
- Occupation: Medical researcher
- Medical career
- Institutions: Albert Einstein College of Medicine; Memorial Sloan Kettering Cancer Center
- Awards: Banting Medal (1989)

Ora Mendelsohn Rosen (October 26, 1935 – May 30, 1990) was an American medical researcher who investigated the influence of hormones, particularly insulin, on the control of cell growth. She was a professor at the Albert Einstein College of Medicine and Memorial Sloan Kettering Cancer Center and a member of the National Academy of Sciences.

== Early life ==
Rosen was born and raised on the Upper West Side of Manhattan. Isaac Mendelsohn, her father, was a professor of Semitic languages at Columbia University and her mother, Fanny Soier, was a remedial reading teacher; both were Zionists. Her brother was Ezra Mendelsohn, a professor of Jewish history at the Hebrew University of Jerusalem. Rosen studied biology at Barnard College, graduating in 1956, the same year that she married the physician Samuel Rosen; they had two sons. She went on to complete a medical degree at the Columbia University College of Physicians and Surgeons in 1960.

== Career ==
After receiving her medical degree, Rosen conducted research on biochemistry and cell biology at New York University. In 1966, she was hired as an assistant professor of medicine by the Albert Einstein College of Medicine. She was promoted to an associate professor a year later and made a full professor in 1975. She became chair of the college's molecular pharmacology department in 1976 and director of the endocrinology division in 1977. In 1984, Rosen left the Albert Einstein College to join the faculty of Memorial Sloan Kettering Cancer Center. There, she led the laboratory of developmental and membrane biology as Abby Rockefeller Mauze Chair of Experimental Therapeutics. After the death of her husband in the early 1980s, Rosen married Jerard Hurwitz, a fellow American Cancer Society member and researcher at Memorial Sloan Kettering.

Rosen's research investigated the influence of hormones, particularly insulin, on the control of cell growth and development. In 1985, she and a group of other scientists from Memorial Sloan Kettering and Genentech cloned the human insulin receptor (INSR) gene—a breakthrough in cell biology. This in turn allowed Rosen and her colleagues to study the insulin receptor's transmission of signals from outside of the cell to the inside. In recognition of her research, she was, in 1989, awarded the Banting Medal and elected to the National Academy of Sciences; she also received an award from the American Medical Women's Association.

== Death ==
Rosen died of breast cancer in Manhattan on May 30, 1990, at the age of 54.
