= Norbert Freinkel =

Norbert Freinkel (January 26, 1926 – September 5, 1989) was a German-born American endocrinologist who was a professor of medicine at Northwestern University Medical School and former president of the American Diabetes Association. His research career focused on diabetes in pregnancy.

== Life and career ==
Freinkel was born in 1926 in Mannheim, Germany, to a Russian father and German mother; the family relocated to the United States in 1934. He attended Weequahic High School in Newark, New Jersey, before earning a bachelor's degree from Princeton University in 1949 and an M.D. from the Medical College of New York University in 1949. He completed his medical residency at Bellevue Hospital and then enrolled in the United States Army, serving at the Walter Reed Army Medical Center from 1950 to 1952. He then completed postgraduate training at Boston City Hospital and married Ruth Kimmelstiel, a dermatologist, in 1955.

Following ten years as a faculty member at Harvard Medical School, he moved to Northwestern University Medical School in 1966, where he would be appointed the C.F. Kettering Professor of Medicine and the director of the Center for Endocrinology, Metabolism and Nutrition. In 1977 and 1978, he served as president of the American Diabetes Association.

Freinkel died from a heart attack on September 5, 1989, while attending a concert in Leningrad.

== Research ==
Freinkel's early research covered the effect of different substances on the thyroid gland, the effect of alcohol consumption on glucose metabolism, and the homeostasis of insulin. In the 1970s and 1980s, he focused on gestational diabetes, a form of diabetes in pregnant women. His contribution to changing treatment programs for pregnant women with diabetes led to a significant reduction in mortality rates for their offspring. His research on diabetes in pregnancy earned him honorary degrees from two Swedish universities in 1981: Uppsala University and Umeå University.

The American Diabetes Association annually presents the Norbert Freinkel Award, which recognizes "Outstanding Scientific Achievement in the Understanding and Treatment of Diabetes and Pregnancy".
