= Gerald Reaven =

American endocrinologist and professor emeritus

Dr. Jerry Reaven
- Born: Gerald M. Reaven; July 28, 1928; Gary, Indiana
- Died: February 12, 2018 (aged 89); Stanford, California
- Education: M.D., University of Chicago, University of Michigan
- Known for: Diabetes research
- Medical career
- Profession: Professor and medical researcher
- Institutions: Stanford University; Senior Vice President for Research for Shaman Pharmaceuticals, Inc.

Gerald M. "Jerry" Reaven (July 28, 1928 – February 12, 2018) was an American endocrinologist and professor emeritus in medicine at the Stanford University School of Medicine in Stanford, California, United States.

Reaven's work on insulin resistance and diabetes mellitus with John W. Farquhar goes back at least to 1965.

A long-term researcher into diabetes, he achieved significant notability with his 1988 Banting Lecture (organized annually by the American Diabetes Association in memory of Frederick Banting). In his lecture, he propounded the theory that central obesity (male-type or apple-shaped obesity), diabetes and hypertension (high blood pressure) have a common cause in insulin resistance and impaired glucose tolerance. Initially titled "syndrome X", the constellation of symptoms is now known as the metabolic syndrome and an object of extensive scientific inquiry, especially given that the combination strongly predisposes for cardiovascular disease. Still, Reaven believes that contemporary criteria are arbitrary and that it may not be necessary to define it as a diagnostic entity more than a pathophysiological parameter.

He obtained his academic qualifications at the University of Chicago and did his internship there. After research work in Stanford and two years in the U.S. Army medical corps he completed his residency at the University of Michigan. He then took up a US Public Health Service research post at Stanford, where he progressed to a full professorship in 1970. He led endocrinology and gerontology research.

Apart from his work at Stanford he was also Senior Vice President for Research for Shaman Pharmaceuticals, Inc. in South San Francisco.

He was a member of several research organizations and received numerous prizes for his research achievements. He was co-author of a popular book on Syndrome X and its repercussions on cardiovascular disease.
