= Bruce M. Spiegelman =

American biochemist and cell biologist

- Born: Massapequa, New York, US
- Awards: InBev-Baillet Latour Prize; Heinrich Wieland Prize; Frederick Banting Medal

Academic background
- Education: B.S., Biology, 1974, College of William & Mary; PhD, Biochemistry, 1978, Princeton University
- Thesis: The regulation of microtubule assembly in mammalian cells (1978)

Bruce Michael Spiegelman is an American biochemist and cell biologist. Since 2008, Spiegelman has been the Stanley J. Korsmeyer Professor of Cell Biology and Medicine at the Dana–Farber Cancer Institute and Harvard Medical School, and director of the Center for Metabolism and Chronic Disease at the Dana-Farber.

== Early life and education ==
Spiegelman was raised in Massapequa, New York, US. He completed his Bachelor of Science degree from College of William & Mary and his PhD from Princeton University. During his time in Virginia, Spiegelman played on their NCAA Division I tennis team. Upon finishing his PhD in the laboratory of Marc Kirschner, Spiegelman conducted his postdoctoral training at Massachusetts Institute of Technology (MIT), in the laboratory of Howard Green, where he began working on fat cells.

== Career ==
Following his postdoctoral training in 1982, Spiegelman joined the faculty at Harvard Medical School (HMS) and the Dana–Farber Cancer Institute. His first few papers were on the cloning of fat-cell selective mRNAs. A few years later, Spiegelman and his colleagues found that the adipose tissues express TNF and other cytokines in rodent and human obesity. This was the first indication that obesity is characterized by a low level of inflammation in the fat tissue. In 1994, Spiegelman and his colleagues uncovered the role of PPAR-gamma in fat production, which they believed could lead to the production of new fat cells. Then, they displayed that the C/EBP path in cells could be knocked out and PPAR could still produce fat cells. As a result of these discoveries, Spiegelman was the recipient of Heinrich Wieland Prize in 1997. Two years following the original discovery, Spiegelman and colleagues discovered a transcriptional coactivator called PGC-1 alpha and a sister gene he named PGC-1 beta in 2002. PGC1a is a powerful regulator of mitochondrial biogenesis in brown fat, muscle and other tissues. PGC1a is also induced in muscle with exercise and promotes some of the cellular and molecular benefits of exercise. As a result of these accomplishments, Spiegelman was elected to the American Academy of Arts and Sciences and the National Academy of Sciences.

Since 2008, Spiegelman has been the Stanley J. Korsmeyer Professor of Cell Biology and Medicine at the Dana–Farber Cancer Institute and Harvard Medical School, and director of the Center for Metabolism and Chronic Disease at the Dana-Farber. In these roles, he identified both parts of a molecular switch that normally causes some immature muscle cells in the embryo to become brown fat cells. As a result, his team showed that they could engineer mouse and human cells to produce brown fat. Spiegelman and colleagues later identified PRDM16 as a crucial factor in brown fat development and the browning of white fat in 2007. His research team showed that this molecule controlled a transcriptional switch between muscle cells and brown fat cells in 2008. These studies led to the identification of beige fat cells (2012), another energy-burning but genetically distinct fat cell in mice and adult humans.

In 2012, Spiegelman and colleagues discovered the myokine irisin (2012) and further demonstrated that this hormone was produced in humans and increased during exercise. As a result of his research, Spiegelman received the Frederick Banting Medal of the American Diabetes Association in 2012 and the Manpei Suzuki Prize in 2013. The following year, he also earned an induction into the National Academy of Medicine and Belgium's InBev-Baillet Latour Prize. Later on it was discovered by other researchers, that the methods used to detect irisin used unspecific antibodies and the results could not be reproduced by other research groups.

During the COVID-19 pandemic, Spiegelman was the recipient of the 2021 Albert Renold Award from the American Diabetes Association. He received the award as "an individual whose career is distinguished by outstanding achievements in the training and mentorship of diabetes research scientists and in the development of communities of scientists to enhance diabetes research."
