= Rachmiel Levine =

Polish-born American endocrinologist

Rachmiel Levine (August 26, 1910 – February 22, 1998) was a Polish-born American endocrinologist and leader in the field of diabetes research.

== Biography ==
Levine was born in 1910 near Chernivtsi, then in Poland and now part of Ukraine. His mother died when he was an infant and his father was killed at the end of World War I. He then relocated to Montreal, Canada, where he was adopted by friends of his family. He attended McGill University, completing an undergraduate degree in 1932 and a medical degree in 1936. Following his graduation, he moved to the United States to complete his internship and residency at Michael Reese Hospital in Chicago. He finished his training in 1938 and, from 1942 to 1960, served director of the hospital's Department of Metabolism and chair of the Department of Medicine. He was chair of the Department of Medicine at New York Medical College from 1960 to 1971, and thereafter was the executive medical director at California's City of Hope National Medical Center until his retirement in 1991.

Levine's early research in Chicago with Samuel Soskin demonstrated that the primary effect of insulin was not on the cytoplasm but rather on the cell membrane, allowing glucose to be transported into cells. He distinguished between forms of glucose that could and could not be metabolized, and showed that those that were not metabolized could still be transported in the presence of insulin. His description of glucose transport, published in 1949, was named "the Levine effect" and led to his being described as "the father of modern diabetes research". His group also found that the effect of exercise on glucose transport in muscle was similar to that of insulin. While working at City of Hope, he led a collaboration between the medical center, Genentech, and Eli Lilly and Company to use cloned genes to produce human insulin to be used as medication. He served as president of the American Diabetes Association in 1964–65 and president of the International Diabetes Federation in 1967–70.

Levine died in Boston on February 22, 1998, from heart failure.

== Awards ==
- 1961: Banting Medal
- 1970: Guggenheim Fellowship
- 1971: Member of the American Academy of Arts and Sciences
- 1971: Canada Gairdner International Award
- 1983: Member of the National Academy of Sciences
