= Radioimmunoassay =

Immunoassay that uses radiolabeled molecules

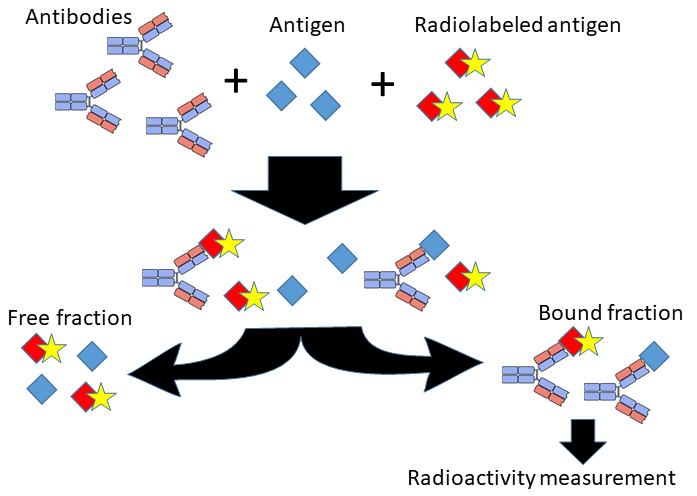
- MeSH: D011863

A radioimmunoassay (RIA) is an immunoassay that uses radiolabeled molecules in a stepwise formation of immune complexes. A RIA is a very sensitive in vitro assay technique used to measure concentrations of substances, usually measuring antigen concentrations (for example, hormone levels in blood) by use of antibodies.

The RIA technique is extremely sensitive and extremely specific, and although it requires specialized equipment, it remains among the least expensive methods to perform such measurements. It requires special precautions and licensing, since radioactive substances are used.

In contrast, an immunoradiometric assay (IRMA) is an immunoassay that uses radiolabeled molecules but in an immediate rather than stepwise way.

A radioallergosorbent test (RAST) is an example of radioimmunoassay. It is used to detect the causative allergen for an allergy.

== Method ==
Classically, to perform a radioimmunoassay, a known quantity of an antigen is made radioactive, frequently by labeling it with gamma-radioactive isotopes of iodine, such as 125-I, or tritium attached to tyrosine. This radiolabeled antigen is then mixed with a known amount of antibody for that antigen, and as a result, the two specifically bind to one another. Then, a sample of serum from a patient containing an unknown quantity of that same antigen is added. This causes the unlabeled (or "cold") antigen from the serum to compete with the radiolabeled antigen ("hot") for antibody binding sites. As the concentration of "cold" antigen is increased, more of it binds to the antibody, displacing the radiolabeled variant, and reducing the ratio of antibody-bound radiolabeled antigen to free radiolabeled antigen. The bound antigens are then separated and the radioactivity of the free(unbound) antigen remaining in the supernatant is measured using a gamma counter. This value is then compared to a standardised calibration curve to work out the concentration of the unlabelled antigen in the patient serum sample.

This method can be used for any biological molecule in principle and is not restricted to serum antigens, nor is it required to use the indirect method of measuring the free antigen instead of directly measuring the captured antigen. For example, if it is undesirable or not possible to radiolabel the antigen or target molecule of interest, a RIA can be done if two different antibodies that recognize the target are available and the target is large enough (e.g., a protein) to present multiple epitopes to the antibodies. One antibody would be radiolabeled as above while the other would remain unmodified. The RIA would begin with the "cold" unlabeled antibody being allowed to interact and bind to the target molecule in solution. Preferably, this unlabeled antibody is immobilized in some way, such as coupled to an agarose bead, coated to a surface, etc. Next, the "hot" radiolabeled antibody is allowed to interact with the first antibody-target molecule complex. After extensive washing, the direct amount of radioactive antibody bound is measured and the amount of target molecule quantified by comparing it to a reference amount assayed at the same time. This method is similar in principle to the non-radioactive sandwich ELISA method.

== History ==
This method was developed by Solomon Berson and Rosalyn Sussman Yalow at the Veterans Administration Hospital in the Bronx, New York. This revolutionary development earned Dr. Yalow the Nobel Prize for Medicine in 1977, the second woman ever to win it. In her acceptance speech, Dr. Yalow said, "The world cannot afford the loss of the talents of half its people if we are to solve the many problems which beset us." Yalow shared the Nobel Prize with Roger Guillemin, and Andrew Schally who earned the prize based on their research into "the peptide hormone production of the brain".
