= George W. Thorn =

American physician

George Widmer Thorn (January 15, 1906 – June 26, 2004) was an American physician whose contributions led to new treatments of kidney diseases and adrenal gland disorders, most notably Addison's disease. Thorn was Chief of Medicine at Boston's Peter Bent Brigham Hospital, presently known as Brigham and Women's Hospital. Thorn pioneered the use of cortisone for treating Addison's disease, and devised an early test for this disease, now known as the Thorn test. His research of cortisone and ACTH led to new treatments of other diseases such as hypertension, rheumatoid arthritis and diabetes.

He participated in the first successful kidney transplant in the 1950s. Thorn was a founding editor and editor-in-chief of Harrison's Principles of Internal Medicine. He was a professor at Harvard Medical School, and held a number of other teaching positions at other schools.

In 1959 he was awarded the Banting Medal.

== Personal life ==
Thorn was born in Buffalo, New York on January 15, 1906. He received his M.D. from University of Buffalo on 1929.
