= George F. Cahill Jr. =

American scientist

George F. Cahill Jr. (July 7, 1927 – July 30, 2012) was an American scientist who significantly advanced the diabetes mellitus research of the 20th century. He focused on metabolic research, especially concerning human glucose metabolism in diabetic and normal conditions; he also investigated the effect of hunger and fasting on metabolic pathways and ketose processes. He was author and co-author of nearly 200 articles in scientific magazines and books.

== Early life ==
George Cahill Jr. was born in New York City. He attended the Hotchkiss School and then completed a course of studies at the Yale University, graduating in 1949. In 1953, he earned a medical doctoral degree at the Columbia College of Physicians and Surgeons.

== Career ==
Cahill started working as a medical assistant at the Biochemical Department at the Peter Bent Bringham Hospital (today: Brigham and Women’s Hospital) in Boston. He was also involved in research at the Albert Baird Hastings laboratory from 1955 until 1957 before he transferred to the Joslin's Diabetes Center in 1958, after another clinical year. There, he took the place of research director when Albert Renold returned to Europe 1962. Cahill held the position until 1978. 1962 he became active in the research at the Howard Hughes Medical Institute (HHMI), since 1972 as member of the advisory board and later as research director and finally vice president. He left the HHMI in 1990. 1970 he became a Harvard Medical School professor. Until 1990 he continued teaching classes, before he had been given emeritus status. Since 1989 Cahill taught a biology course for non-biologists at the Dartmouth College.

== Personal life ==
Cahill married Sarah ("Sally") duPont († 2010) in 1949. They had four daughters and two sons.

== Works (selection) ==
- Cahill, GF (1961). "Metabolic role of adipose tissue". Trans. Am. Clin. Climatol. Assoc. 73: 22–9. PMC 2249046. PMID 13875555.
- Cahill, GF; Owen, OE (1968). "Starvation and survival". Trans. Am. Clin. Climatol. Assoc. 79: 13–20. PMC 2441175. PMID 5667163.
- Owen, OE; Felig, P; Morgan, AP; Wahren, J; Cahill, GF (March 1969). "Liver and kidney metabolism during prolonged starvation". J. Clin. Invest. 48 (3): 574–83. doi:10.1172/JCI106016. PMC 535723. PMID 5773093.
- Felig, P; Marliss, E; Owen, OE; Cahill, GF (March 1969). "Blood glucose and cluconeogenesis in fasting man". Arch. Intern. Med. 123 (3): 293–8. doi:10.1001/archinte.1969.00300130075011. PMID 4885676.
- Cahill, GF (March 1970). "Starvation in man". N. Engl. J. Med. 282 (12): 668–75. doi:10.1056/NEJM197003192821209. PMID 4915800.
- Cahill, GF; Aoki, TT (1971). "Starvation and body nitrogen". Trans. Am. Clin. Climatol. Assoc. 82: 43–51. PMC 2441035. PMID 4934018.
- Felig, P; Marliss, EB; Cahill, GF (February 1971). "Metabolic response to human growth hormone during prolonged starvation". J. Clin. Invest. 50 (2): 411–21. doi:10.1172/JCI106508. PMC 291937. PMID 5540176.
- Cahill, GF; Aoki, TT; Ruderman, NB (1973). "Ketosis". Trans. Am. Clin. Climatol. Assoc. 84: 184–202. PMC 2441301. PMID 4199621.
- Cahill, GF (July 1976). "Starvation in man". Clin Endocrinol Metab. 5 (2): 397–415. doi:10.1016/s0300-595x(76)80028-x. PMID 182420.
- Cahill, GF (April 1979). "Human evolution and insulin-dependent (IDD) and non-insulin dependent diabetes (NIDD)". Metab. Clin. Exp. 28 (4 Suppl 1): 389–93. doi:10.1016/0026-0495(79)90043-x. PMID 400563.
- Cahill, GF (1983). "President's address. Starvation". Trans. Am. Clin. Climatol. Assoc. 94: 1–21. PMC 2279566. PMID 6764569.
- Cahill, GF; Veech, RL (2003). "Ketoacids? Good medicine?". Trans. Am. Clin. Climatol. Assoc. 114: 149–61, discussion 162–3. PMC 2194504. PMID 12813917.
- Cahill, G. F. (2006). "Fuel Metabolism in Starvation". Annual Review of Nutrition. 26: 1–22. doi:10.1146/annurev.nutr.26.061505.111258. PMID 16848698.

== Awards (selection) ==
- Young Investigator Award of the Endocrine Society and the American Diabetes Association
- 1963: Oppenheimer Award of the Endocrine Society
- 1979: Gairdner Foundation International Award
- 1980: member of the American Academy of Arts and Sciences
