= Elliott P. Joslin =

American physician (1869-1962)

Elliott Proctor Joslin
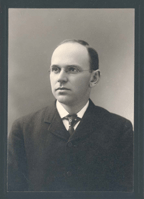
- Born: June 6, 1869; Oxford, Massachusetts, U.S.
- Died: January 28, 1962 (aged 92); Brookline, Massachusetts, U.S.
- Education: Harvard Medical School, Yale University, Leicester Academy
- Occupations: Physician, writer

Elliott Proctor Joslin (June 6, 1869 – January 28, 1962) was the first medical doctor in the United States to specialize in diabetes and was the founder of the present-day Joslin Diabetes Center in Boston, Massachusetts.

Joslin was involved for seven decades in most aspects of diabetes investigation and treatment, save for the fact that he did not discover insulin. Following the Toronto group's blockbuster discovery of insulin in 1921, and the group's disbanding several years later, Joslin became effectively the dean of diabetes mellitus. In the mid-1920s, Joslin, in his mid-50s, took the reins as the world spokesman for the "cause of diabetes." He was the first to advocate for teaching patients to care for their own diabetes, an approach now commonly referred to as DSME or Diabetes Self-Management Education. He is also a recognized pioneer in glucose management, identifying that tight glucose control leads to fewer and less extreme complications.

Joslin was elected to the American Academy of Arts and Sciences in 1912 and the American Philosophical Society in 1925.

== Early life ==
Elliott Joslin was born to wealthy parents in 1869 in Oxford, Massachusetts, where his father was a mill owner. He was educated at Leicester Academy, Yale College and Harvard Medical School. After graduating from Yale, Elliott Joslin extended his time at the university by enrolling in a master's degree in physiological chemistry. This interest in chemistry, along with his aunt's recent diagnosis of diabetes, led him to an interest in diabetes and metabolic disease.

== Medical career ==
From the beginning of his medical practice he kept a diabetes registry, the first of its kind in the world. His carefully assembled data from his medical ledgers eventually allowed him to predict a global diabetes epidemic that is evident today. In 1908, in conjunction with physiologist Francis G. Benedict, Joslin carried out extensive metabolic balance studies examining fasting and feeding in patients with varying severities of diabetes. His findings would help to validate the observations of Frederick Madison Allen regarding the benefit of carbohydrate- and calorie-restricted diets. The patients were admitted to units at New England Deaconess Hospital, helping to initiate a program to help train nurses to supervise the rigorous diet program.

Joslin was an educator at heart and advocated total immersion of his patients and families in classroom education. He felt that careful monitoring of diabetes that rendered good control would allow the patient to avoid chronic complications of diabetes along with prevention of acute acidosis. Joslin included the findings from 1,000 of his own cases in his 1916 monograph The Treatment of Diabetes Mellitus, the first textbook on diabetes in the English language. Here he noted a 20 percent decrease in the mortality of patients after instituting a program of diet and exercise. This physician's handbook had 10 more editions in his lifetime and established Joslin as a world leader in diabetes.

Two years later, Joslin wrote Diabetic Manual — for the Doctor and Patient, detailing what patients could do to take control of their disease. This was the first diabetes patient handbook and became a best seller. There have been 14 editions of this pioneering handbook, and a version is still published today by the Joslin Diabetes Center under the title The Joslin Guide to Diabetes.

When insulin became available as therapy in 1922, Joslin's corps of nurses became the forerunners of certified diabetes educators, providing instruction in diet, exercise, foot care and insulin dosing, and established camps for children with diabetes throughout New England. With insulin available, Joslin enlarged his medical practice into a team that evolved into the Joslin Clinic, which was affiliated with the New England Deaconess Hospital and the Harvard Medical School.

Joslin's associates were chosen to expand his interests in foot salvage for the middle aged diabetic prone to peripheral vascular disease as well as group education for diabetics in the hospital setting. This later expanded to include the first nurse educator service and children's diabetic camps. His proteges, including Alexander Marble and Priscilla White, followed his mandate to investigate problems in diabetes and metabolism. Marble became Joslin's first research director, and White created the first "high risk" pregnancy clinic aimed at improving outcomes for infants and the insulin-dependent woman during pregnancy and at delivery.

The first hospital blood glucose monitoring system for pre-meal testing was developed under Joslin's direction before 1940 and was the forerunner of the modern glucometer era. Joslin was also the first to name diabetes a serious public health issue. Just after WWII, he expressed concern to the Surgeon General of the U.S. Public Health Service that diabetes was an epidemic, and challenged the government to do a study in his hometown, Oxford, Massachusetts. The study was started in 1946 and soon confirmed the true incidence of diabetes in the general population (including a percentage of cases that went undetected). The study was carried out over the next 20 years. The results would later confirm Joslin's fear that the incidence of diabetes in the United States was approaching epidemic proportions. He has been named as being, with Frederick Madison Allen, one of the two leading diabetologists from the pre-Insulin period between 1910 and 1920.

In 1952, Joslin's group practice became officially known as the Joslin Clinic. In 1956, the office moved to its current location at One Joslin Place in Boston. It was the world's first diabetes care facility, and today maintains its place as the largest diabetes clinic in the world.

Joslin was adamant in his position that good glucose control, achieved through a low-carbohydrate diet, exercise, and frequent testing and insulin adjustment, would prevent complications. This was debated for decades by other endocrinologists and scientists. The opposing point of view, led by Edward Tolstoi, held that tight control had little long-term effect, but a profound effect on lifestyle.

== Controversy ==
Before the discovery of insulin, Joslin and Frederick Madison Allen promoted fasting and undernutrition to treat diabetic patients. Critics referred to this as "starvation dieting," and some patients starved to death.

== Selected publications ==
- A Diabetic Manual for the Mutual Use of Doctor and Patient (1918)
- Diabetic Metabolism with High and Low Diets (1923)
- The Treatment of Diabetes Mellitus: With Observations Based Upon Three Thousand Cases (1923)

== Quotes ==
- "The diabetic who knows the most, lives the longest."
- "It is better to discuss how far you have walked, then how little you have eaten."
- "A well trained nurse is of more value than the patient’s doctors."
- "We can only scratch one back at a time, but we can teach many patients together and each is likely to teach another."
- "The man who gives up an active outdoor life and is promoted to an office chair by this change becomes a promising candidate for diabetes."
- "The person with diabetes needs character building just as much as body building… personal responsibility for his own and family welfare should always be cultivated in the foreground."
- "Learn as if you have to learn forever, live as if you die tomorrow."
- "(Diabetologic) Education is not a part of the treatment of diabetes, it is the treatment.",
