= Lelio Orci =

Italian endocrinologist

Lelio Orci (22 March 1937 – 22 October 2019) was an Italian scientist in the field of endocrinology and diabetes and emeritus professor in the Department of Morphology at the University of Geneva Medical School.

Orci was born in 1937 in San Giovanni Incarico. He received his BA in 1958. He studied medicine at the University of Rome, graduating in 1964. In 1966, he moved to the University of Geneva where he worked ever since. He was chair of the Department of Morphology from 1976 until his retirement in 2000, transitioning to professor emeritus.

Orci is known for his work on cell and tissue biology using electron microscopy. In the first part of his research career, Orci's laboratory largely studied the organization of the pancreatic islet of Langerhans, as well as the secretion pathway of insulin from the beta cell. His group was the first to utilize immunogold labelling to localize intracellular proteins (published in 1980), and among the first to use freeze-fracture with electron microscopy to study a cell's internal organization. In 1984, he began collaborating with James Rothman on the work in vesicle trafficking that eventually earned Rothman, Randy Schekman, and Thomas C. Südhof the Nobel Prize.

== Awards ==
- 1973 : Minkowski Prize (European Association for the Study of Diabetes)
- 1977 : Nessim-Habif World Prize, University of Geneva
- 1979 : Fernand Tissot Prize
- 1978 : Mack-Foster Award (European Society for Clinical Investigation)
- 1978 : David Rumbough Award (American Juvenile Diabetes Foundation)
- 1981 : Banting Medal (American Diabetes Association)
- 1983 : Dale Medal (Society for Endocrinology)
- 1985 : King Faisal International Prize for Medicine
- 1986 : Otto Naegeli Prize for Medicine
- 1986 : Special Golgi Award (European Association for the Study of Diabetes)
- 1987 : Morgagni Medal (G.B. Morgagni International Prizes)
- 1991 : Elliot P. Joslin Award (Massachusetts Affiliate of the American Diabetes Association)
- 1998 : Member of the Senate of the Swiss Academy of Medical Sciences
- 1998 : Foreign Member of National Academy of Sciences
- 1999 : Fellow of the American Association for the Advancement of Science
- 2000 : Lucien Dautrebande Triennial Prize (The Physiopathology Foundation)
- 2007 : Leon Lombarti Prize
- Order of Commander of Honor by the Italian Government

The Lelio Orci Award for advances in cell biology was established in 2015.

== Personal life ==
In a 2020 obituary, Orci was described as having a "strong, flamboyant personality" and "infectious enthusiasm" for science. He traveled rarely, instead working long hours in his laboratory.

Orci had a wife, Catherine, and three children.
