= Rosalyn Sussman Yalow =

American medical physicist (1921–2011)

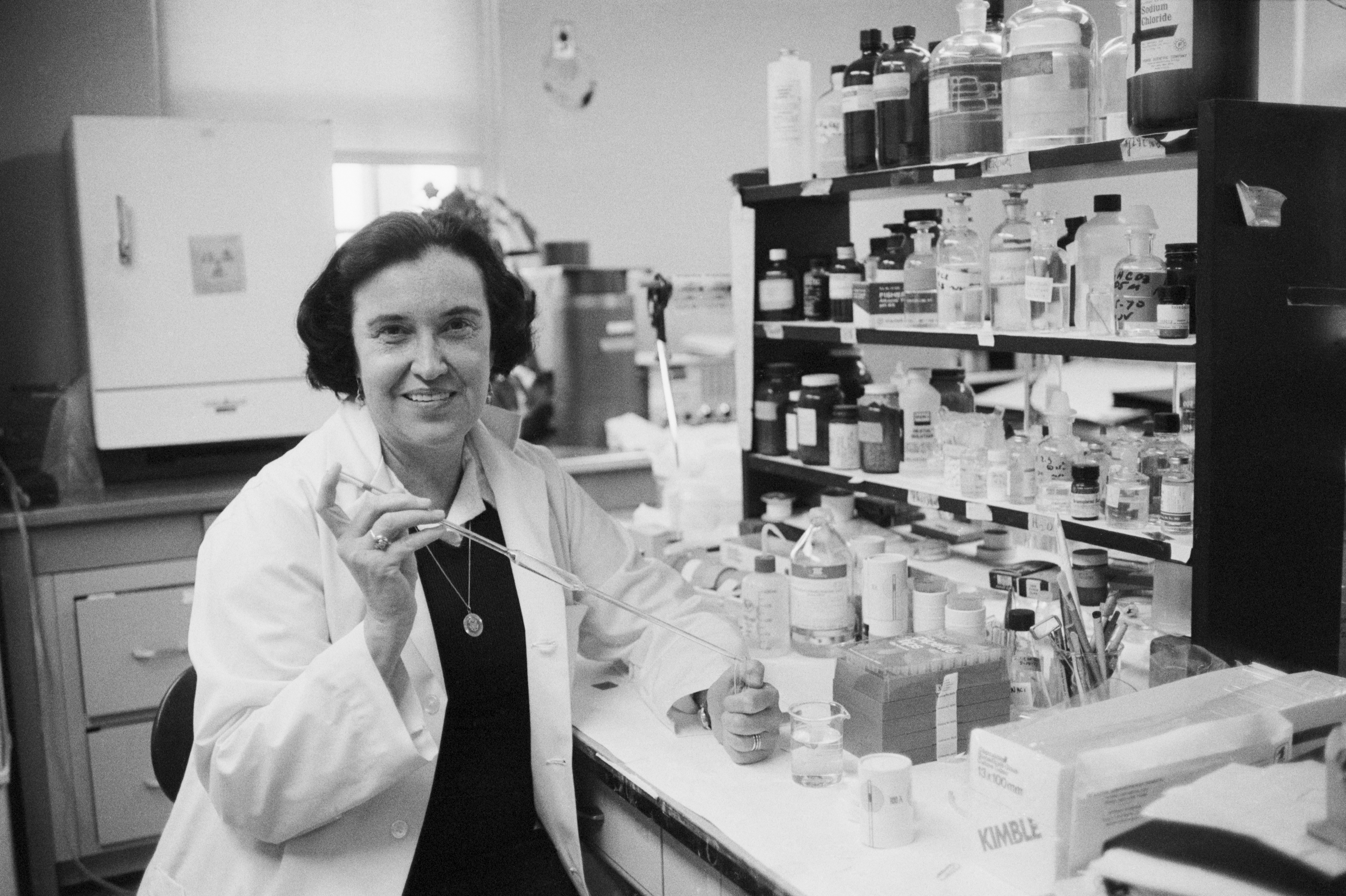
- Rosalyn Yalow (1977)
- Born: Rosalyn Sussman; July 19, 1921; New York City, U.S.
- Died: May 30, 2011 (aged 89); New York City, U.S.
- Education: Hunter College; University of Illinois Urbana-Champaign (PhD, 1945)
- Known for: Radioimmunoassay
- Spouse(s): A. Aaron Yalow (m. 1943; 2 children; d. 1992)
- Awards: 1972 Dickson Prize; 1975 AMA Scientific Achievement Award; 1976 Albert Lasker Award for Basic Medical Research; 1977 Nobel Prize in Physiology or Medicine; 1979 President's Award for Distinguished Federal Civilian Service; 1988 National Medal of Science
- Scientific career
- Fields: Medical physics
- Workplaces: Bronx Veteran's Administration Hospital

Rosalyn Sussman Yalow (July 19, 1921 – May 30, 2011) was an American medical physicist, and a co-winner of the 1977 Nobel Prize in Physiology or Medicine (together with Roger Guillemin and Andrew Schally) for development of the radioimmunoassay technique. She was the second woman (after Gerty Cori), and the first American-born woman, to be awarded the Nobel Prize in Physiology or Medicine.

== Biography ==
=== Childhood ===
Rosalyn Sussman Yalow was born in the Bronx, New York, the daughter of Clara (née Zipper) and Simon Sussman, and was raised in a Jewish household. She went to Walton High School (Bronx), New York City. After high school, she attended the all-female, tuition-free Hunter College, where her mother hoped she would learn to become a teacher. Instead, Yalow decided to study physics.

I was excited about achieving a career in physics. My family, being more practical, thought the most desirable position for me would be as an elementary school teacher.

— Rosalyn Yalow

=== College ===
Yalow knew how to type, and was able to get a part-time position as a secretary to Dr. Rudolf Schoenheimer, a leading biochemist at Columbia University's College of Physicians and Surgeons. She did not believe that any respectable graduate school would admit and financially support a woman, so she took another job as a secretary to Dr. Michael Heidelberger, another biochemist at Columbia, who hired her on the condition that she studied stenography. She graduated from Hunter College in January 1941.

A few years later, she received an offer to be a teaching assistant in physics at the University of Illinois Urbana-Champaign. She received this offer partially because World War II had just begun and many men went off to fight, and the university opted to offer women education and jobs to avoid being shut down. At the University of Illinois Urbana-Champaign, she was the only woman among the University's 400 members, and the first since 1917. Yalow earned her PhD in 1945. The next summer, she took two tuition-free physics courses under government auspices at New York University.

=== Marriage and children ===
She married fellow student Aaron Yalow, the son of a rabbi, in June 1943. They had two children, Benjamin and Elanna Yalow, and kept a kosher home. Yalow did not believe in "balancing her career with her home life" and instead incorporated her home life wherever she could into her work life. However, she viewed the traditional roles of a homemaker as a priority, and devoted herself to traditional duties associated with motherhood and being a wife. Throughout her career, she tended to shun feminist organizations, but still advocated for including more women in science. While she believed the reason she had certain opportunities in physics was because of the war, she thought that the reason that the number of women in this field decreased after the war was due to a lack of interest. Yalow saw the feminist movement as a challenge to her traditional beliefs and thought that it encouraged women not to fulfill their duties to become mothers and wives.

== Scientific career ==
The month after graduating from Hunter College in January 1941, Rosalyn Sussman Yalow was offered a position as a teaching assistant in the physics department of the University of Illinois Urbana-Champaign. Gaining acceptance to the physics graduate program in the college of engineering at the University of Illinois was one of the many hurdles she had to overcome as a woman in her field. Powerful male figures controlled opportunities for training, recognition, promotion, and many aspects of development in the field of science, and especially physics.

When Yalow entered the university in September 1941, she was the only woman in the faculty, which comprised 400 professors and teaching assistants. She was the first woman since 1917 to attend or teach at this engineering college. Yalow credited her position at the prestigious graduate school to the shortage of male candidates during World War II. Being surrounded by gifted men made her aware of a wider world in science. They recognized her talent, they encouraged her, and they supported her. They were in a position to help her succeed.

Yalow felt that other women in her field did not like her because of her ambition. Other women saw her curiosity as abandoning the only acceptable path for a woman in science at the time, becoming a high school science teacher, but Yalow wanted to be a physicist. During her time at the University of Illinois, she took extra undergraduate courses to increase her knowledge because she wanted to do original experimental research in addition to her regular teaching duties.

For years Yalow faced criticism from women at work but she never quit nor turned her back on other young women, if she believed they had the potential to become real scientists. She never became an advocate for women's organizations in the field of science. She was even quoted as saying, "It bothers me that there are now organizations for women in science, which means they think they have to be treated differently from the men. I don't approve." Although girls and young women found a role model in her after she won her Nobel, Yalow was not a champion for improving women's treatment or representation in science.

Yalow's first job after teaching and taking classes at the University of Illinois Champaign-Urbana graduate school was as an assistant electrical engineer at Federal Telecommunications Laboratory. She again found herself to be the only woman employee. In 1946, she returned to Hunter College to teach physics and consequently influenced many women, most notably a young Mildred Dresselhaus: Yalow was responsible for steering the future "Queen of Carbon Science" away from primary school teaching and into a research career. She remained a physics lecturer from 1946 to 1950, although by 1947, she began her long association with the Veterans Administration by becoming a consultant to the Bronx Veteran's Administration Hospital.

The Veteran's Administration wanted to establish research programs to explore medical uses of radioactive substances. By 1950, Yalow had equipped a radioisotope laboratory at the Bronx VA Hospital and decided to leave teaching to finally devote her attention to full-time research. There she collaborated with Solomon Berson to develop radioimmunoassay, a radioisotope tracing technique that allows the measurement of tiny quantities of various biological substances in human blood as well as a multitude of other aqueous fluids. Originally used to study insulin levels in diabetes mellitus, the technique has since been applied to hundreds of other substances – including hormones, vitamins and enzymes – all which had been present in quantities or concentrations that were previously too small to detect. Without the contributions of Yalow to the work of accurate hormone measurement, it would be impossible to diagnose hormone-related conditions and endocrine diseases like type 1 diabetes.

Despite its huge commercial potential, Yalow and Berson refused to patent the method. In 1968, Yalow was appointed as a research professor in the department of medicine at Mount Sinai Hospital, where she later became the Solomon Berson Distinguished Professor at Large. Yalow also had a passion for the next generation of researchers. She acted as a mentor figure to scientists from around the world, many of whom came to share her passion for investigative endocrinology research. One of her students, John Eng, later used her radioimmunoassay technique in 1992 to discover a novel substance in Gila monster venom which he called exendin-4. Exenatide, a drug based on a synthetic version of exendin-4, was approved by the U.S. Food and Drug Administration in 2005. It was the first of the GLP-1 receptor agonist drugs which became enormously popular in the 2020s for diabetes management and weight loss. Another mentee, Dr. Narayana Panicker Kochupillai, went on to become a leading endocrinology researcher in India, studying thyroid hormones and iodine deficiency. In these ways, Yalow's legacy in endocrinology was carried on. A fitting title for Rosalyn Yalow may well be "the Mother of Endocrinology."

== Awards ==
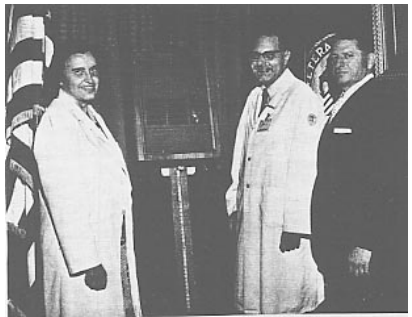
Yalow (left), receiving the Middleton Award with Kenneth Sterling, MD (center), and Bronx VA Medical Center Director Harold Jaffrey (right)

Yalow was awarded a Fulbright fellowship to Portugal.

In 1961, Yalow won the Eli Lilly Award of the American Diabetes Association, which provides scholarships for up to 100 scholars to attend Scientific Sessions, the world's largest scientific and medical conference focused on diabetes and its complications. In addition, it provides the education and training for these scholars to serve as faculty for professional education programs and to clinically manage the disease.

A year later, she was awarded the Gairdner Foundation International Award, which recognizes the world's most creative and accomplished biomedical scientists who are advancing humanity.

The same year, Yalow was awarded the American College of Physicians Award, which recognizes excellence and distinguished contributions by individuals to internal medicine.

In 1972, Yalow was awarded the William S. Middleton Award for Excellence in Research, which is the highest honor awarded annually by the Biomedical Laboratory Research and Development Service to senior biomedical research scientists in recognition of their outstanding scientific contributions and achievements, pertaining to the healthcare of veterans.

Also in 1972, she was given the Koch Award of the Endocrine Society, which awards individuals for their dedication to excellence in research, education and clinical practice in the field of endocrinology.

In 1975, Yalow and Berson (who had died in 1972) were awarded the American Medical Association Scientific Achievement Award, which is a gold medallion award presented to individuals on special occasions in recognition of their outstanding work in scientific achievement.

The following year she became the first female recipient and first nuclear physicist of the Albert Lasker Award for Basic Medical Research. Established by Albert and Mary Lasker in 1945, the award is intended to celebrate scientists who have made fundamental biological discoveries and clinical advances that improve human health.

In 1977, Yalow was the sixth individual woman (seventh overall, considering Marie Curie's two wins), and first American-born woman, to win the Nobel Prize in a scientific field. She was also the second woman in the world to win in the physiology or medicine category (the first was Gerty Cori). Yalow was honored for her role in devising the radioimmunoassay technique, along with Roger Guillemin and Andrew V. Schally for their research in another field. By measuring substances in the human body, the screening of the blood of donors for such diseases as hepatitis was made possible. Radioimmunoassay can be used to measure a multitude of substances found in tiny quantities in fluids within and outside of organisms (such as viruses, drugs and hormones). The list of substances is endless, but specifically, it allowed blood donations to be screened for various types of hepatitis. The technique can also be used to identify hormone-related health problems. Further, it can be used to detect in the blood many foreign substances including some cancers. Finally, the technique can be used to measure the effectiveness of dose levels of antibiotics and drugs.

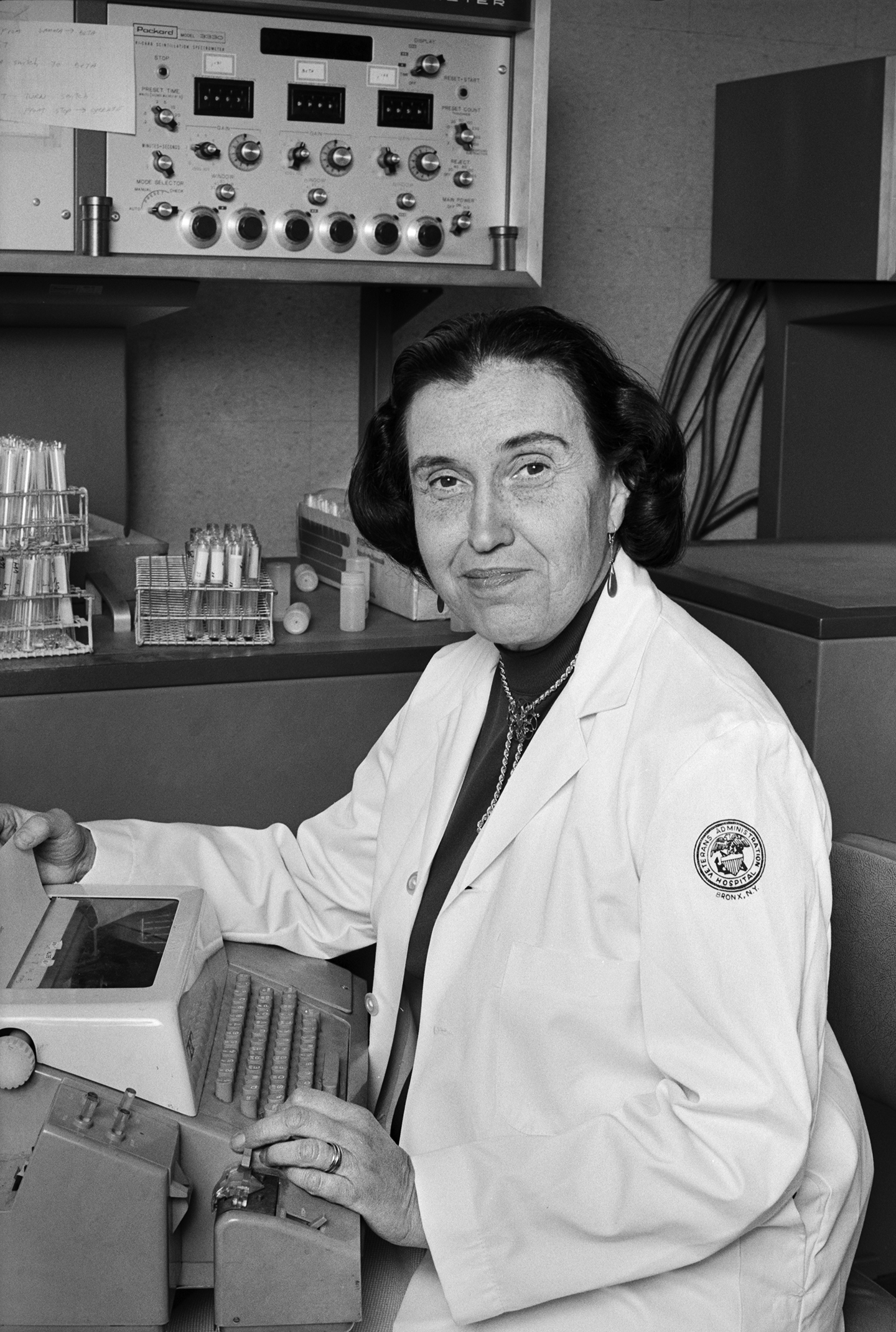
Rosalyn Sussman Yalow photographed in 1978 by Lynn Gilbert

In 1977, Yalow received the Golden Plate Award of the American Academy of Achievement.

In 1978, Yalow was elected a Fellow of the American Academy of Arts and Sciences, which provides an opportunity for an early-career professional with training in science or engineering to learn about a career in public policy and administration.

In 1986, Yalow was awarded the A. Cressy Morrison Award in Natural Sciences of the New York Academy of Sciences, which is offered by Mr. Abraham Cressy Morrison to individuals with superlative papers on a scientific subject within the field of The New York Academy of Sciences and its Affiliated Societies.

In 1988, Yalow received the National Medal of Science, which is given to American individuals who deserve the highest honor in science and technology.

In 1993, Yalow was inducted into the National Women's Hall of Fame.

== Death ==
Yalow died May 30, 2011, in the Bronx, New York.

== See also ==
- List of female Nobel laureates
- List of Jewish Nobel laureates
- Timeline of women in science
