= Solomon Berson =

American physician & scientist (1918–1972)

- Born: Solomon Aaron Berson; April 22, 1918; New York City, New York, U.S.
- Died: April 11, 1972 (aged 53); Atlantic City, New Jersey, U.S.
- Occupations: Physician and scientist
- Employer: Bronx Veteran's Administration Hospital
- Known for: Advances in clinical biochemistry

Solomon Aaron Berson (April 22, 1918 – April 11, 1972) was an American physician and scientist whose discoveries, mostly together with Rosalyn Yalow, caused major advances in clinical biochemistry. Five years after Berson's death, Yalow received a Nobel Prize, which cannot be awarded posthumously, for their joint work on the radioimmunoassay.

== Biography ==
=== Early life ===
Born in New York City, Berson was a keen musician and chess player. He graduated from the City College of New York in 1938. After failing to obtain a place in medical school he earned an MSc (1939) and an anatomy instructorship at New York University before finally securing a place in NYU medical school in 1941. He completed his degree (Alpha Omega Alpha) in 1945, and after internships in Boston and two years in the army he returned to New York to do an internal medicine residency at the Bronx Veterans Administration Hospital.

=== Scientific career ===
Berson's scientific work started in 1950, when he became a member of the Radioisotope Service of the hospital, where he teamed with Rosalyn Yalow in what eventually became an historic research partnership. He also set up a thyroid service, where his approach was felt lastingly. Their early laboratory work concerned iodine and human serum albumin metabolism, but later on in the decade they shifted their focus to insulin, a hormone which was difficult to measure in the blood. They developed the radioimmunoassay, which gave very good results, and published their findings in 1960. They were able to distinguish between two types of diabetes, Type I and Type II, which have significantly different mechanisms.

With the success of the insulin RIA, Berson and Yalow extended their success to other hormones, such as corticotropin, gastrin, parathyroid hormone and growth hormone, making significant discoveries in their physiology along the way.

=== Death ===
In 1972, Berson died of a heart attack in Atlantic City while attending a FASEB meeting. Upon his death he was survived by his widow and two daughters.

The Solomon A. Berson Medical Alumni Achievement Award was created in Berson's honor by NYU School of Medicine.

== Awards ==
Berson, usually together with Yalow, received numerous awards for his work. In 1968, he was elected Murray M. Rosenberg Professor and Chair of Medicine at Mount Sinai School of Medicine of the City University of New York, enjoying great popularity. He also served on the editorial boards of several medical journals. He was elected to the National Academy of Sciences in 1972. In 1975 Berson and Yalow received the AMA Scientific Achievement Award (Berson posthumously), and two years later Yalow received a Nobel Prize (which cannot be awarded posthumously) for their joint work on the radioimmunoassay.
