= Diabetes (journal) =

- Discipline: Diabetes
- Language: English
- Edited by: David A. D'Alessio

Publication details
- Former name(s): Proceedings of the American Diabetes Association; Diabetes Abstracts
- History: 1952-present
- Publisher: American Diabetes Association (United States)
- Frequency: Monthly
- Impact factor: 9.337 (2021)

Standard abbreviations
- ISO 4: Diabetes

Indexing
- CODEN: DIAEAZ
- ISSN: 0012-1797 (print); 1939-327X (web)
- LCCN: 55058482
- OCLC no.: 01566563

Diabetes is a monthly peer-reviewed medical journal published since 1952 by the American Diabetes Association. It covers research about the physiology and pathophysiology of diabetes mellitus including any aspect of laboratory, animal or human research. The Emphasis is on investigative reports focusing on areas such as the pathogenesis of diabetes and its complications, normal and pathologic pancreatic islet function and intermediary metabolism, pharmacological mechanisms of drug and hormone action, and biochemical and molecular aspects of normal and abnormal biological processes. Diabetes also publishes abstracts presented at the ADA's annual meeting, Scientific Sessions, as a supplement.

According to the Journal Citation Reports, the journal has a 2021 impact factor of 9.337, and a 5 years impact factor of 10.509 ranking it 8th out of 240 journals in the category "Endocrinology, Diabetes & Metabolism".

== See also ==
- American Diabetes Association
- Diabetes Care
