= George King =

George King may refer to:

== Politics ==
- George King (Australian politician) (1814–1894), New South Wales and Queensland politician
- George King, 3rd Earl of Kingston (1771–1839), Irish nobleman and MP for County Roscommon
- George Clift King (1848–1934), English-born mayor of Calgary Alberta
- George Edwin King (1839–1901), Canadian politician; premier of New Brunswick
- George G. King (politician) (1801–1854), Wisconsin farmer and legislator
- George Gerald King (1836–1928), Canadian politician from New Brunswick
- George Gordon King (1807–1870), U.S. Representative from Rhode Island
- George H. King (politician), North Carolina politician

== Sports ==
- George King (Scottish footballer) (1870–1916), Scottish footballer
- George King (footballer, born 1923) (1923–2009), English footballer
- George King (footballer, born 2007), Irish footballer
- George King (basketball, born 1928) (1928–2006), American basketball player and head coach
- George King (basketball, born 1994), American basketball player
- George King (cricketer, born 1857) (1857–1944), English cricketer
- George King (cricketer, born 1822) (1822–1881), English cricketer
- George King (New Zealand cricketer) (1845–1894), New Zealand cricketer
- George King (rugby league) (born 1995), Warrington Wolves rugby league player
- George King (Australian footballer) (1892–1976), Australian rules footballer
- George M. King (1896–1963), college football player
- George W. King (c. 1880–1961), American college football player and coach

== Military ==
- George King (Royal Navy officer) (1809–1891), commander-in-chief, China Station
- George Augustus King (1885–1917), officer in the New Zealand Military Forces

== Other ==
- George King (botanist) (1840–1909), British botanist working in India, whose standard author abbreviation is King
- George King (religious leader) (1919–1997), British author and founder of the Aetherius Society
- George Edward King (1851–1934), Atlanta hardware mogul
- George L. King (born 1950), Taiwanese-born physician for Harvard
- George Lanchester King (1860–1941), bishop of Madagascar, 1899–1919
- George King (film director) (1899–1966), British film director
- George G. King (historian), American art historian and museum director
- George H. King (judge) (born 1951), U.S. federal judge
- George Gelaga King (1932–2016), Sierra Leone judge
- George Rogers King (1807–1871), justice of the Louisiana Supreme Court
- George King, actor who played Mr. Flak in Hairspray (2007 film)

== See also ==
- George King-Hall (1850–1939), Royal Navy admiral and last commander of the Australia Squadron
- George E. King (disambiguation)
