= Priscilla White =

Priscilla White may refer to:

- Priscilla White (physician) (1900–1989), pioneer in the treatment of diabetes during pregnancy and juvenile diabetes
- Cilla Black (Priscilla Maria Veronica White, 1943–2015), English singer and television personality
