= George E. King =

George E. King may refer to:

- George Edwin King (1839–1901), second and fourth Premier of New Brunswick, Canada
- George Edward King (1851–1934), Atlanta, Georgia hardware mogul

== See also ==
- George King (disambiguation)
