= Pulsatile insulin =

Injection of insulin in pulses (versus continuous infusions)

Pulsatile intravenous insulin therapy, sometimes called metabolic activation therapy or cellular activation therapy, describes in a literal sense the intravenous injection of insulin in pulses versus continuous infusions. Injection of insulin in pulses mimics the physiological secretions of insulin by the pancreas into the portal vein which then drains into the liver. In healthy, non-diabetic individuals, pancreatic secretions of insulin correspond to the intake of food. The pancreas will secrete variable amounts of insulin based upon the amount of food consumed (basically speaking, the more food that is consumed, the more insulin the pancreas will secrete) among other factors. Continuous exposure to insulin and glucagon is known to decrease the hormones' metabolic effectiveness on glucose production in humans due to the body developing an increased tolerance to the hormones. Down-regulation at the cellular level may partially explain the decreased action of steady-state levels of insulin, while pulsatile hormone secretion may allow recovery of receptor affinity and numbers for insulin. Intermittent intravenous insulin administration with peaks of insulin concentrations may enhance suppression of gluconeogenesis and reduce hepatic glucose production.

== Background ==
Dr. Thomas Aoki, former Head of Metabolism Research at the Joslin Diabetes Center in Boston, Massachusetts, and a former professor of medicine at the University of California, Davis, led the field as a pioneer of using pulsatile insulin in the treatment of diabetes. Aoki's work focused on the role of liver dysfunction in diabetic metabolism. He theorized that end organ damage in diabetes is caused by abnormal hepatic glucose metabolism, inadequate insulin delivery, and insulin resistance. He called his approach Metabolic Activation Therapy (MAT), which consisted of an ever-increasing baseline of insulin using Respiratory Quotient to determine the efficiency of treatment (US Patent 4,826,810).

== Pulsatile insulin and the liver ==
Normally, insulin is secreted from the pancreas in pulses into the portal vein which brings blood into the liver in variable amounts, closely related to ingestion of meals. For induction and maintenance of insulin-dependent enzymes essential for glucose metabolism in the liver (e.g. hepatic glucokinase, phosphofructokinase, and pyruvate kinase), the hepatocytes require a defined insulin level (200-500 μU/ml in the portal vein) concomitant with high glucose levels (which acts as a bimolecular signal). In non-diabetic subjects, portal insulin concentrations are twofold to threefold greater than those in the peripheral circulation. During the first pass through the liver, 50% of the insulin is removed, strongly insinuating that the liver is the principal metabolic target organ of the gastrointestinal tract and the pancreas. The insulin retained by the hepatocytes may itself be essential for the long-term effects of insulin on hepatic glucose metabolism as well as growth and de novo enzyme synthesis. Following oral glucose intake, the liver accounts for an equal or greater portion of total net glucose uptake compared to the periphery. Insulin exerts pivotal control of glucose levels through its ability to regulate hepatic glucose production directly or indirectly. The traditional subcutaneous (S.C.) insulin administration regimens used by diabetic patients fails to capture the pulsatile nature of natural insulin secretion and does not reach high enough insulin concentrations at the hepatocyte level (e.g., 10 U regular insulin injected S.C. produce a peak systemic circulation concentration of 30–40 μU/ml and an even lower portal vein concentration of 15–20 μU/ml).

== Reviews on efficacy ==
Several literature reviews by insurers conclude that there is insufficient evidence of efficacy. Studies have not shown a benefit with pulsatile insulin delivery.

== Third party payment ==
Most insurers refuse to cover the treatment. In some hearings and cases where a judge has heard evidence, insurance companies have been ordered to pay for that patient. For example, a trial with CalPERS resulted in a decision ordering Blue Cross and other insurance providers to pay for the therapy as to those parties. However, a subsequent assessment by CMS found no evidence that Pulsatile Insulin improves the condition of type 1 and 2 diabetics and has issued a National non-coverage decision which to date is still in effect. CMS has issued a specific code to use when billing this treatment to avoid erroneous payment by billing by the individual procedures that are used in the treatment. Until acceptable clinical trials are performed to show the benefit of pulsatile insulin or Artificial Pancreas Treatment as it is being currently marketed as, the Medicare NCD will continue to remain in effect.
