= C. Ronald Kahn =

American physician and scientist

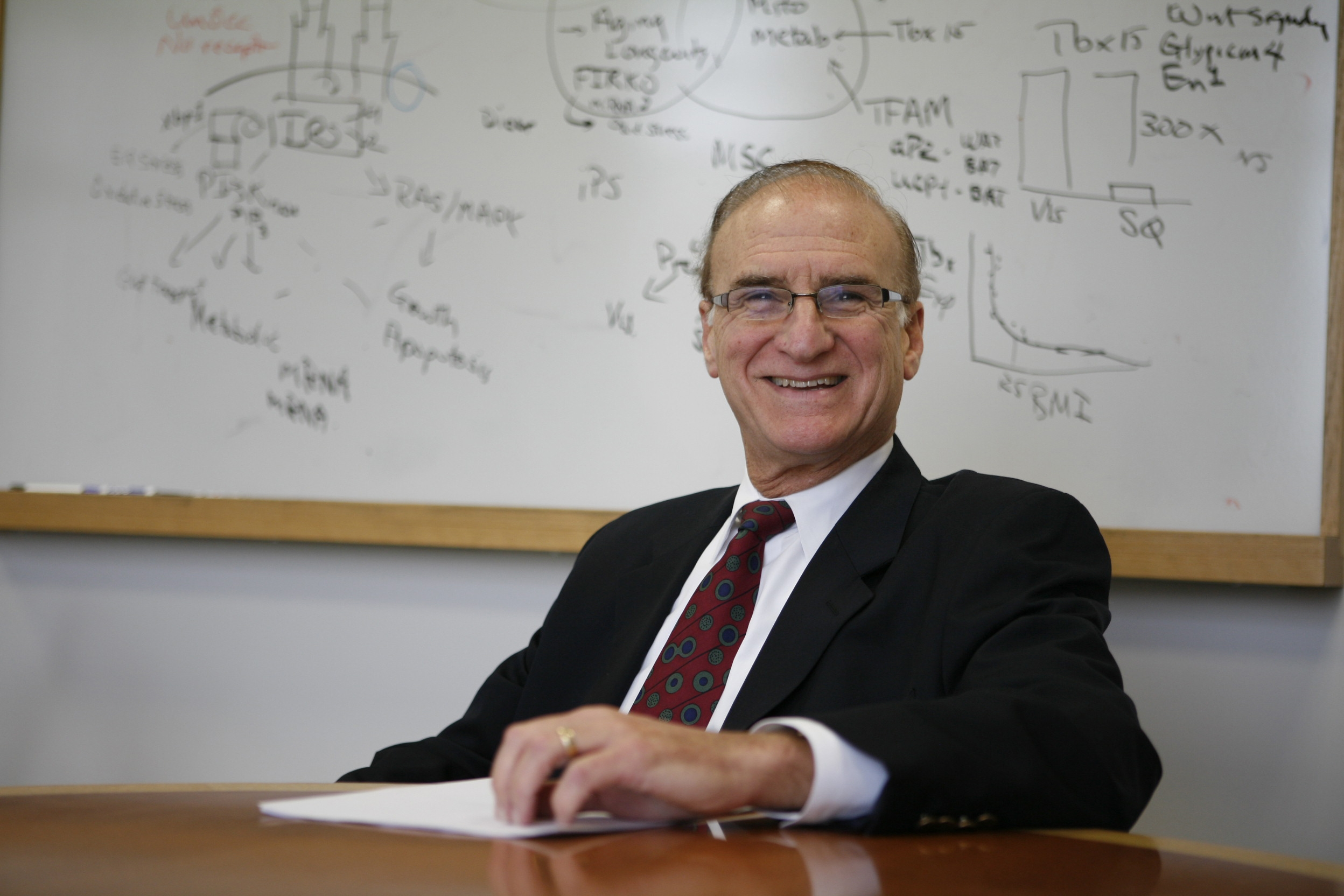
- Born: January 14, 1944 (age 82); Louisville, Kentucky, United States
- Education: University of Louisville
- Medical career
- Profession: Physician, scientist
- Field: Endocrinology
- Institutions: Joslin Diabetes Center; Harvard Medical School; National Academy of Sciences
- Sub-specialties: Diabetes and Obesity
- Research: Diabetes and Obesity research
- Awards: Banting Award, American Diabetes Association (1993); Fred Conrad Koch Award, Endocrine Society (2000); Hamden Award for Medical Research, UAE (2000); J. Allyn Taylor International Prize in Medicine (2002); Manpei Suzuki International Award for Diabetes (2009); Wolf Prize in Medicine (2016)

Carl Ronald Kahn (born January 14, 1944) is an American physician and scientist, best known for his work with insulin receptors and insulin resistance in diabetes and obesity. He is the Chief Academic Officer at Joslin Diabetes Center, the Mary K. Iacocca Professor of Medicine at Harvard Medical School and a member of the National Academy of Sciences since 1999.

== Early life and career ==
Kahn was born in Louisville, Kentucky. He received his undergraduate and medical degree from the University of Louisville in 1964 and 1968. He became interested in pursuing diabetes research while serving in several positions at the National Institutes of Health (NIH) from 1970 to 1981. He moved to Boston in 1981 when he was appointed Associate Professor of Medicine at Harvard Medical School and Research Director of the Joslin Diabetes Center. By 1984, he was promoted to Professor of Medicine and named the Mary K. Iacocca Professor of Medicine at Harvard Medical School in 1986.

== Appointments ==
Kahn became the president and director of Joslin in 2000 and held this position until 2007. In 2012, he was appointed Joslin's first Chief Academic Officer.

Outside of Joslin, Kahn also held various leadership roles. In 1998 he was appointed chair of the Congressionally-mandated Diabetes Research Working Group (DRWG). This group developed a strategic plan which served as the roadmap for growth of the diabetes research for the United States over the following 10 years. Dr. Kahn also served as chair of Class IV (Biomedical Sciences) of the National Academy of Sciences from 2007 to 2010.

== Personal life ==
Kahn is married to Susan Becker Kahn, also formerly of Louisville. They have two children. Stacy Anne Kahn is a pediatric gastroenterologist at the Boston Children's Hospital. Jeffrey Adam Kahn is managing partner of Continuum Search based in Denver, Colorado. His brother Arnold Kahn was emeritus professor of developmental biology of the University of California San Francisco.

== Research contributions ==
Kahn is an investigator in insulin signal transduction and mechanisms of altered signaling in diabetes. The main discoveries to come from his lab include the insulin receptor kinase, its two primary substrates and the molecular components of the insulin signaling network. Kahn's lab was also the first to define alterations in the signaling network in insulin resistant states, such as type 2 diabetes. More recent discoveries from his lab encompass defining alterations in the signaling network in type 2 diabetes, including the important role of insulin action in unexpected tissues such as brain, both in physiologic regulation and potentially in development of Alzheimer's disease. His lab at Joslin has also made contributions to the understanding of obesity by showing that fat cells, called adipocytes, have different developmental origins and cellular functions that lead to risk of metabolic disease.

Kahn's work with adult humans has demonstrated that they have active brown fat that is central to redefining its role in metabolic regulation and protection from obesity.

== Awards and recognition ==
- David Rumbough Award for Scientific Achievement, Juvenile Diabetes Foundation (1977)
- Eli Lilly Award for Research, American Diabetes Association (1981)
- Cristobal Diaz Award for Research, International Diabetes Federation (1988)
- Banting Medal for Distinguished Scientific Achievement, American Diabetes Association (1993)
- Solomon Berson Distinguished Lecture, American Physiological Society (1997)
- Albert Renold Award, American Diabetes Association (1998)
- Dorothy Hodgkin Award, British Diabetes Association (1999)
- Fred Conrad Koch Award for Distinguished Contributions to Endocrinology, Endocrine Society (2000)
- Hamdan Award for Medical Research Excellence, awarded by Sheikh Hamdan bin Rashid Al Maktoum Award for Medical Sciences, Dubai, United Arab Emirates (2000)
- Lawson Wilkins Award Lecture, Pediatric Endocrine Society (2001)
- Rolf Luft Award Lecture, Karolinska Institute, Stockholm, Sweden (2001)
- Steven C. Beering Award for Advancement of Biomedical Science, Indiana University (2002)
- J. Allyn Taylor International Prize in Medicine for Diabetes, Toronto, Canada (2002)
- Manpei Suzuki International Prize for Top Diabetes Researcher Worldwide (Inaugural Recipient), Tokyo, Japan (2009)
- Hans Falk Memorial Lecture, National Institute of Environmental Health Science (2009)
- Presidential Lecture, Memorial Sloan Kettering Cancer Institute, New York (2010)
- Alpha Omega Alpha Visiting Professor, Columbia University Medical School, New York, NY (2010)
- Frontiers in Science Award, American Association of Clinical Endocrinologists (2010)
- Cockrell Foundation Award in Basic and Clinical Research, Houston, TX (2010)
- Distinguished Leader in Insulin Resistance, World Congress of Insulin Resistance in Diabetes and Cardiovascular Disease, Los Angeles, CA (2010)
- David Murdock Dole Honorary Lecture, Mayo Clinic-Karolinska, Nobel Forum, Stockholm, Sweden (2011)
- Wallace H. Coulter Award, American Association of Clinical Chemistry (2013)
- Helmholtz Diabetes Research Lifetime Achievement Award, Munich, Germany (2013)
- Honorary Adjunct Member, Max Planck Institute, Cologne, Germany (2014)
- Ipsen Foundation Prize in Endocrine Regulation (2015)
- Harold Hamm Prize in Diabetes (2015)
- Wolf Prize in Medicine, Jerusalem, Israel (2016)
