= George B. Walden =

American chemist

- Born: February 18, 1895; Indiana
- Died: August 6, 1982 (aged 87)
- Occupation: Chemist

George B. Walden (February 18, 1895 - August 6, 1982) was a chemist who worked for Eli Lilly and Company on the mass production of insulin. He discovered isoelectric precipitation, which solved a major problem and led to the mass production of insulin.

The team at the University of Toronto working on insulin had inconsistent results in purifying it and eventually turned to Eli Lilly for help and George Walden (who started working for Eli Lilly as a 28-year-old chemist in 1917 for $85 each month) was put in charge of the project.

Walden was the head chemist at Eli Lilly in 1922. Previous attempts at purification of insulin attempted to keep the insulin in solution and precipitate out the contaminating proteins. Walden found that if he adjusted the pH to produce the maximum precipitation, the precipitate contained highly purified insulin. His process yielded insulin that was 10 to 100 times more pure than previous batches.
