= Joslin Diabetes Center =

Coordinates: 42.339101°N 71.108440°W

- Beth Israel Lahey Health

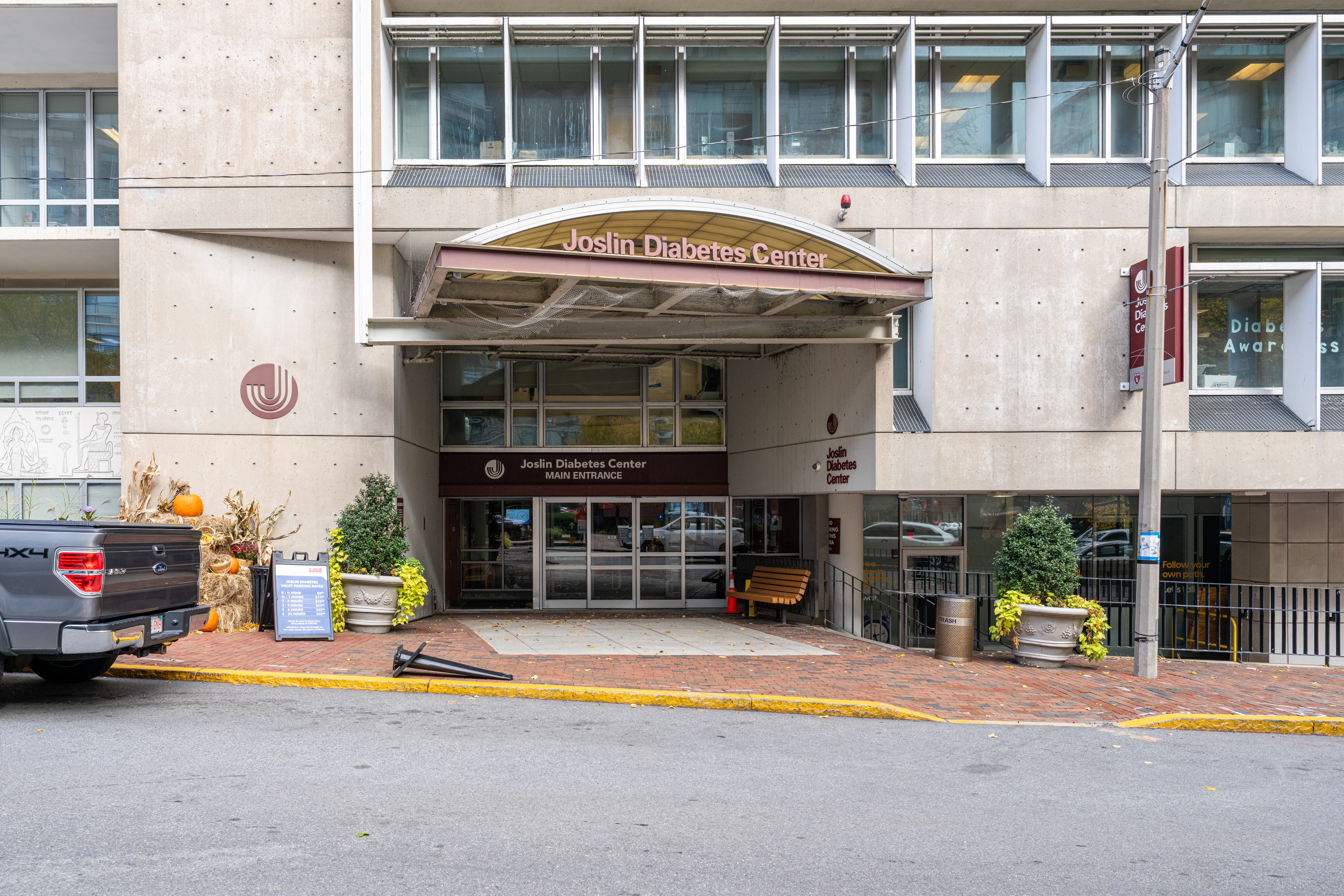
- Joslin Diabetes Center - Main Entrance (2025)

Geography
- Location: 1 Joslin Pl, Boston, Massachusetts, United States

Organization
- Type: Specialist
- Affiliated university: Harvard Medical School

Services
- Speciality: Diabetes

History
- Founded: 1952

Links
- Website: www.joslin.org
- Lists: Hospitals in Massachusetts

Joslin Diabetes Center is the world's largest diabetes research center, diabetes clinic, and provider of diabetes education. It is located in the Longwood Medical and Academic Area in Boston, Massachusetts, United States. Among the Harvard Medical School affiliated institutions, Joslin is unique in its sole focus on diabetes. Joslin has the world's largest team of board-certified physicians treating diabetes and its complications, as well as the largest staff of Certified Diabetes Educators anywhere in the world. Joslin also supports the world's largest diabetes research team with more than 40 faculty investigators and more than 300 researchers.

Roberta Herman, M.D., is currently Joslin's President and CEO.

== History ==
Joslin has helped revolutionize the diagnosis, treatment, and prevention of diabetes, most notably by improving the survival rate of babies born to women with diabetes, developing sight-saving laser surgery, devising treatments to reduce amputation, and uncovering ways to predict who will develop diabetes. It was named after Elliott P. Joslin, an American doctor and pioneer in the study of diabetes.

Some notable historic milestones include:

- 1949: Priscilla White, M.D., a founding member of Joslin Clinic, introduces the White Classification of Diabetic Pregnancies. This pioneering concept classifies patients according to their level of risk and tailors their treatment protocol accordingly. When Dr. Priscilla White joined Joslin's practice in 1924, only 56 percent of babies born to diabetic mothers survived; 50 years later when she retired, that rate had jumped to more than 90 percent.
- 1967: A laser treatment (Ruby laser photocoagulation) is developed by William Beetham, M.D., and Lloyd M. Aiello, M.D., which within the next five years revolutionizes the care of diabetic retinopathy, a potentially blinding complication of diabetes.
- 1976: Joslin researchers perfect the A1C test, paving the way for this blood test to assess blood glucose control over a two- to three-month period.
- 1980s: Basic research at Joslin shows that type 1 diabetes evolves over a period of years, presenting hope that a means may be found to prevent autoimmune destruction of the pancreas’ beta cells before they stop producing insulin.
- 1980s: C. Ronald Kahn and his team defines the molecular mechanism of insulin action and how it is altered in insulin-resistant states such as type 2 diabetes and obesity.
- 1989: George King, M.D., and colleagues demonstrate that high blood glucose levels activate protein kinase C (PKC), part of a major signaling pathway that causes cellular changes in the eye, kidney and arteries that lead to diabetic complications.
- 1996: A molecular pathway (called NF-κB) is identified in fat and the liver that is activated by obesity (and a fatty diet) and causes the insulin resistance that can lead to type 2 diabetes (Steven E. Shoelson, M.D., Ph.D.).
- 1998: Joslin Vision Network—a telemedicine technology developed at Joslin—found to produce images of the retina just as accurately as standard equipment, but without having to dilate the pupil. Remote sites across the United States can now access Joslin's expertise in diabetic eye disease diagnosis and treatment.
- 2002: The Diabetes Prevention Program (DPP) study shows people with elevated blood glucose levels who are at risk for developing type 2 diabetes can reduce their risk by 58 percent through sustained modest weight loss and increased moderate-intensity exercise, such as walking 30 minutes daily.
- 2003: Researchers discover that early signs of kidney disease (microalbuminuria) can be reversed back to normal with proper medical screening and diabetes control.
- 2006: Joslin researchers find that specific genes can determine both obesity and body-fat distribution in humans.
- 2009: Researchers in the lab of C. Ronald Kahn discover that brown fat is present in some adults, providing a new target for the treatment of obesity.

== Clinical Services ==
Some of the clinical programs at Joslin include:

Beetham Eye Institute: The Beetham uses advanced diagnostics, laser treatment, cataract and retinal surgery, vision rehabilitation, and novel therapies to help preserve the eyesight of diabetic patients.

Adult Clinic Care Joslin has a reputation for pioneering care and support of pediatric patients with diabetes and their families. The pediatric staff includes board-certified endocrinologists, pediatric diabetes nurse educators, pediatric nutritionists, child psychologists, a social worker, and a child life specialist.

Pediatric Clinic Care Joslin has a reputation for pioneering care and support of pediatric patients with diabetes and their families. The pediatric staff includes board-certified endocrinologists, pediatric diabetes nurse educators, pediatric nutritionists, child psychologists, a social worker, and a child life specialist.

Multicultural Health Clinics: In response to the fact that Latinos and Asian Americans develop diabetes at a much higher rate, Joslin established clinics for these patient populations. They offer culturally sensitive care and bilingual staff.

Patient EducationJoslin has the largest staff of Certified Diabetes Educators anywhere in the world. Specialists work with patients one-on-one, or through a variety of programs and classes. Educators work as part of the diabetes care team to provide coordinated, sequenced learning activities.

Nephrology Section: Joslin provides the educational, medical, and emotional support needed to manage all forms of kidney disease, which impacts a significant number of people with diabetes. The goal is to detect, delay, and potentially reverse the effects of diabetes on the kidneys as early as possible.

Joslin also offers specialty programs in cardiovascular disease, mental health and counseling services, peripheral neuropathy, obesity, insulin pump therapy, diabetes and pregnancy, diabetes and aging, hypoglycemia, sexual function and disorders of the feet.

Joslin has a number of initiatives aimed at developing and providing culturally-competent diabetes education, such as the Latino Diabetes Initiative and the Asian American Diabetes Initiative.

== Research ==
Many important improvements in diabetes care were developed at Joslin. These include recognition that tight blood glucose control can slow or prevent diabetes complications, creation of treatment protocols to enable women with diabetes to have healthy babies, the identification of markers for pre-diabetes, and pioneering laser surgery for diabetic eye disease. Joslin researchers have won awards and recognition from the National Academy of Sciences, the National Academy of Medicine, and the American Diabetes Association, among many others.

== New Joslin Diabetes Center Location ==
As of July, 2026, The Joslin Diabetes Center has moved to its new location in the Carl J. Shapiro Clinical Center Building at Beth Israel Deaconess Medical Center. The new center is diagonally across the street from the former site on One Joslin Place.The Diabetes clinics (Adult, Adolescent and Pediatric) are on the first floor. The Beetham Eye Institute is on the second floor. At the former site of the Joslin Diabetes Center a new cancer center is scheduled to be built.
