= Synthetic crystalline bovine insulin =

Artificially produced insulin

In 1965, Chinese scientists first synthesized crystalline bovine insulin (Chinese: 人工合成结晶牛胰岛素), which was the first functional crystalline protein being fully synthesized in the world. Research on synthesizing bovine insulin started on 1958. Members in the research group were from the Chemistry Department of Beijing University (Chinese: 北京大学化学系), Shanghai Institute of Biochemistry, CAS (Chinese: 中科院上海生物化学研究所) and Shanghai Institute of Organic Chemistry, CAS (Chinese: 中科院上海有机化学研究所).

Insulin is a protein (peptide) consisting of two chain, A and B. Chain A consists of 21 amino acid residues while chain consists of 30 amino acid residues. The main function of insulin is to regulate the concentrate of sugar in blood. Type 1 diabetes are caused by dysfunction on the synthesis or secretory of insulin while injecting insulin can treat type 1 diabetes.

In 1979, Wang Yinglai, the project's lead scientist, nominated Niu Jingyi, a team member who had made significant contributions, for the Nobel Chemistry Prize, but the nomination was unsuccessful.

== See also ==
- Helmut Zahn
- Panayotis Katsoyannis
- Cell-free protein synthesis
