= Diabetes and pregnancy =

Effects of pre-existing diabetes upon pregnancy

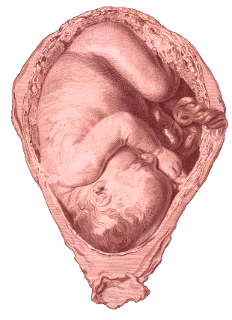

For pregnant women with diabetes, some particular challenges exist for both mother and fetus. If the pregnant woman has diabetes as a pre-existing disorder, it can cause early labor, birth defects, and larger than average infants. Therefore, experts advise diabetics to maintain blood sugar level close to the normal range about 3 months before planning for pregnancy.

When type 1 diabetes mellitus or type 2 diabetes mellitus is pre-existing, planning in advance is emphasized if one wants to become pregnant, and stringent blood glucose control is needed before getting pregnant.

== Physiology ==
Pregestational diabetes can be classified as Type 1 or Type 2 depending on the physiological mechanism. Type 1 diabetes mellitus is an autoimmune disorder leading to destruction of insulin-producing cell in the pancreas; type 2 diabetes mellitus is associated with obesity and results from a combination of insulin resistance and insufficient insulin production. Upon becoming pregnant, the placenta produces human placental lactogen (HPL), a hormone with counter-regulatory actions leading to increased blood glucose levels. In combination with pre-existing diabetes, these maternal physiological changes can lead to dangerously high blood glucose levels. This is significant because the consequences of poor glycemic control are more severe during pregnancy compared to non-pregnant states.

== Risks for the fetus ==
The negative effects of pregestational diabetes are due to high blood sugar and insulin levels primarily during the first trimester of pregnancy (in contrast to gestational diabetes, which can lead to fetal complications during the second and third trimesters). Since this period is when many of the major internal structures and organs of the fetus are developed, pre-existing diabetes can lead to congenital abnormalities. These include abnormal development of the heart and the central nervous system (brain and spinal cord). Strong correlations have been reported between diabetes and sacral agenesis, holoprosencephaly, and longitudinal limb deficiency. With regards to the heart, increased likelihood of truncus arteriosus, atrioventricular septal defect, and single ventricle complex has been found. These complications are generally rare and can be averted with tight blood sugar control. Mild neurological and cognitive deficits in offspring — including increased symptoms of ADHD, impaired fine and gross motor skills, and impaired explicit memory performance — have been linked to pregestational type 1 diabetes and gestational diabetes.

Pre-existing diabetes can also lead to complications in the neonate after birth, including neonatal jaundice, hypoglycemia, and macrosomia. Pregestational diabetes does not, however, increase the likelihood of diseases due to chromosomal alterations (e.g., Down Syndrome). Furthermore, miscarriages are also increased due to abnormal development in the early stages of pregnancy.

Furthermore, when blood glucose is not controlled, shortly after birth, the infant's lungs may be underdeveloped, which can cause respiratory problems. Hypoglycemia can occur after birth if the mother's blood sugar was high close to the time of delivery, which causes the baby to produce extra insulin of its own. A hyperglycemic maternal environment has also been associated with neonates who are at greater risk for the development of negative health outcomes such as future obesity, insulin resistance, type 2 diabetes mellitus, and metabolic syndrome.

== Diabetes pregnancy management ==
Blood glucose levels in pregnant women should be regulated as strictly as possible. During the first weeks of pregnancy, less insulin treatment is required due to tight blood sugar control as well as the extra glucose needed for the growing fetus. At this time basal and bolus insulin may need to be reduced to prevent hypoglycemia. Frequent testing of blood sugar levels is recommended to maintain control. As the fetus grows and weight is gained throughout the pregnancy, the body produces more hormones, which may cause insulin resistance and the need for more insulin. At this time, it is important for blood sugar levels to remain in range as the baby will produce more of its own insulin to cover its mother's higher blood sugar level, which can cause fetal macrosomia. During delivery, which is equivalent to exercise, insulin needs to be reduced again, or hyperglycemia can occur. After the baby is delivered and the days following, there are no more hormones from the placenta that demand more insulin; therefore, insulin demand is decreased and gradually returns to normal requirements.

Diabetes mellitus may be effectively managed by appropriate meal planning, increased physical activity, and properly instituted insulin treatment. Some tips for controlling diabetes in pregnancy include:

- Cut down sweets, eat three small meals and one to three snacks a day, maintain proper mealtimes, and include balanced fiber intake in the form of fruits, vegetables, and whole grains.
- Increased physical activity - walking, swimming/aquaerobics, etc.
- Monitor blood sugar level frequently; doctors may ask to check the blood glucose more often than usual.
- The blood sugar level should be below 95 mg/dL (5.3 mmol/L) on awakening, below 140 mg/dL (7.8 mmol/L) one hour after a meal and below 120 mg/dL (6.7 mmol/L) two hours after a meal.
- Each time when checking the blood sugar level, keep a proper record of the results and present to the health care team for evaluation and modification of the treatment. If blood sugar levels are above targets, a perinatal diabetes management team may suggest ways to achieve targets.
- Many may need extra insulin during pregnancy to reach their blood sugar target. Insulin is not harmful to the baby.

The National Institute of Health and Care Excellence now recommends closed-loop insulin systems as an option for all women with type 1 diabetes who are pregnant or planning pregnancy.

== Breastfeeding ==
In general, breastfeeding is good for the child even with a mother with diabetes mellitus. The child's risk for developing type 2 diabetes mellitus later in life may be lower if the baby was breast-fed. Breastfeeding also helps the child maintain a healthy body weight during infancy. However, the breastmilk of mothers with diabetes has been demonstrated to have a different composition than that of non-diabetic mothers, containing elevated levels of glucose and insulin and decreased polyunsaturated fatty acids. Although benefits of breast-feeding for the children of mothers with diabetes have been documented, ingestion of diabetic breast milk has also been linked to delayed language development on a dose-dependent basis.

In some cases, pregnant women with diabetes may be encouraged to express and store their colostrum during pregnancy, in case their blood sugar is too low for feeding the baby breast milk after birth. There is no evidence on the safety or potential benefits when pregnant women with diabetes express and store breast milk before the baby's birth.

== Classification ==
The White classification, named after Priscilla White, who pioneered research on the effect of diabetes types on perinatal outcome, is widely used to assess maternal and fetal risk. It distinguishes between gestational diabetes (type A) and diabetes that existed before pregnancy (pregestational diabetes). These two groups are further subdivided according to their associated risks and management.

There are 2 classes of gestational diabetes (diabetes that began during pregnancy):

- Class A_{1}: gestational diabetes; diet controlled
- Class A_{2}: gestational diabetes; medication controlled

The second group of diabetes, which existed before pregnancy, can be split up into these classes:

- Class B: onset at age 20 or older or with duration of less than 10 years
- Class C: onset at age 10-19 or duration of 10–19 years
- Class D: onset before age 10 or duration greater than 20 years
- Class E: overt diabetes mellitus with calcified pelvic vessels
- Class F: diabetic nephropathy
- Class R: proliferative retinopathy
- Class RF: retinopathy and nephropathy
- Class H: ischemic heart disease
- Class T: prior kidney transplant

An early age of onset or long-standing disease comes with greater risks, hence the first three subtypes.

== See also ==
- Diabetes mellitus
- Gestational diabetes
- Pregnancy
