= George King (Scottish footballer) =

Scottish footballer

Personal information
- Date of birth: 1870
- Place of birth: Dunblane, Scotland
- Date of death: 1 July 1916 (aged 46)
- Place of death: Somme, France
- Position(s): Wing half

Senior career*
Years	Team	Apps	(Gls)
- Sunderland Albion
1892–1894	Burnley	33	(2)
- Millwall Athletic
- *Club domestic league appearances and goals

George King (1870 – 1 July 1916) was a Scottish professional footballer who played as a wing half in the Football League for Burnley.

== Personal life ==
King served as a private in the Northumberland Fusiliers during the First World War and was killed on the first day of the Somme in 1916. He is commemorated on the Thiepval Memorial.
