= George G. King (historian) =

American museum director and art historian

George G. King is an American art historian and museum director. He served as the first professional director of the Katonah Museum of Art and director of the Georgia O'Keeffe Museum from 1998 to 2008.

Following his position at the Georgia O'Keeffe Museum, King went on to serve as director of the American Federation of Arts, the Mystic Museum of Arts, and deputy director of ArtsWestchester.
