= George L. King =

Taiwanese-born Harvard medical doctor (born 1950)

George Liang King
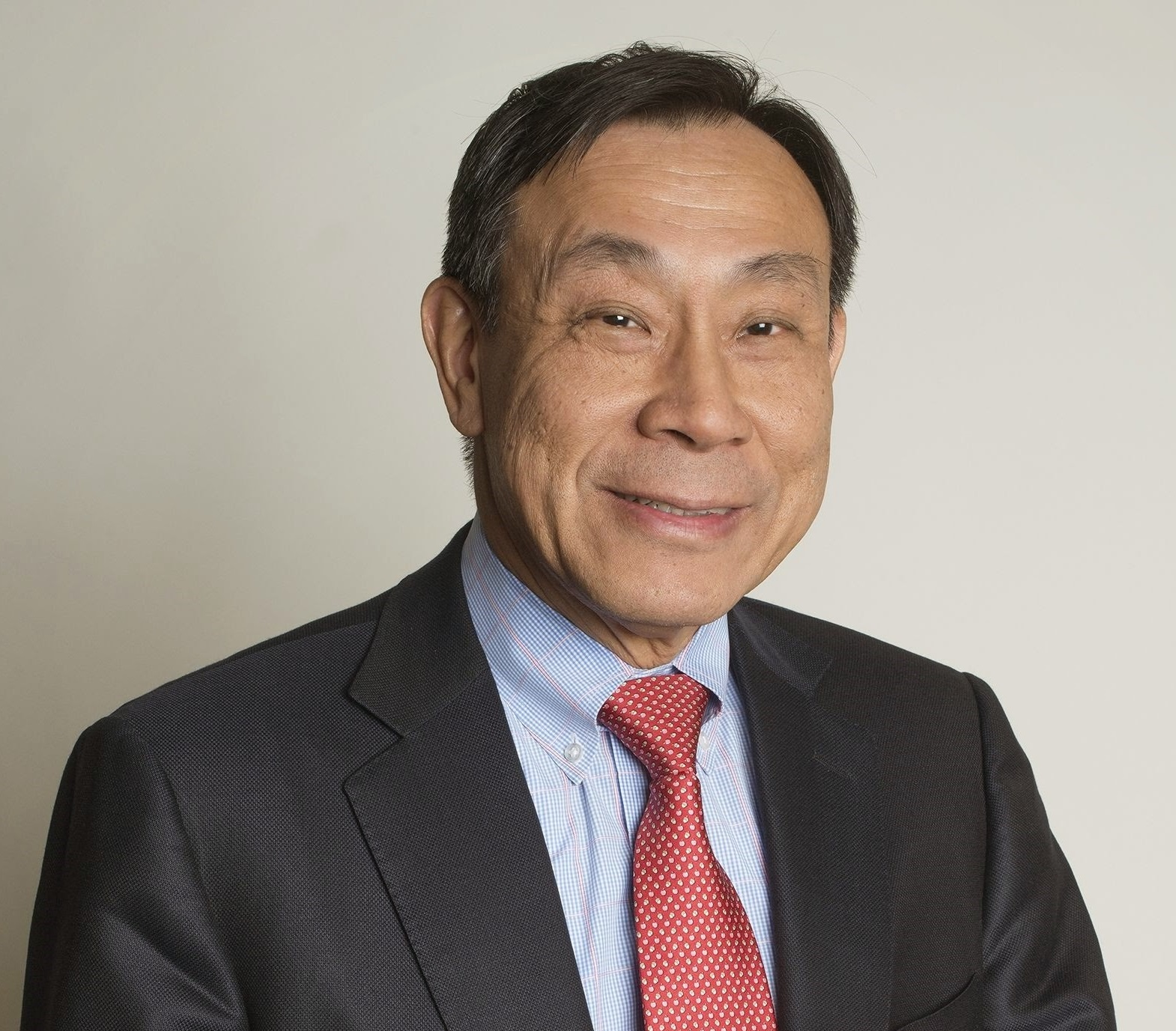
- Born: 1950 (age 75–76); Taiwan
- Education: Johns Hopkins University (BA); Duke University (MD)
- Medical career
- Profession: Physician-scientist
- Field: Endocrinology, Diabetology, Ophthalology
- Institutions: Joslin Diabetes Center; Harvard Medical School; NIDDK

George Liang King (Note: Also attested as George Liang King Jr.) (born 1950) is a Taiwanese-American physician-scientist and diabetologist affiliated with the Joslin Diabetes Center and Harvard Medical School. King is a researcher on how diabetes affects the Asian American population; and on diabetes-related complications. He is the inaugural Thomas J. Beatson, Jr. Chair at Harvard Medical School, as well as Director of Research, Senior Vice President at the Joslin Diabetes Center, where he is also ex officio a board of trustees member.

== Personal life and education ==
King was born in 1950. He moved from Taiwan to the United States with his family when he was 10 years old. He learned English from an elementary school teacher in Richmond, Virginia after living in the U.S. and was one of only two Asians in his elementary and high school classes. His father suffered from diabetes.

In 1972, King earned a Bachelor of Arts degree from Johns Hopkins University, and later a Doctor of Medicine degree from Duke University School of Medicine. He completed a residency at the University of Washington before pursuing additional training at the National Institutes of Health.

== Career ==
King has been affiliated with Joslin and Harvard since 1981. He was elected to The American Society for Clinical Investigation in 1986. He has published over 350 scientific papers, which have been cited nearly 100 thousand times. These articles mostly correspond to topics in Internal Medicine, Endocrinology and Diabetes Mellitus. His current research aims at finding protective biochemical factors acting to prevent complications in a large, special group of medalist type 1 diabetic patients who have remained relatively healthy even after 50 or more years suffering the disease. King also leads a national effort to improve care for diabetes in Asian Americans, who develop diabetes at low body weight. King is the founder of Joslin's Asian American Diabetes Initiative, which runs Asian Diabetes Clinic, a provider of exceptional patient care, and culture tailored education materials. Since 2011, he Co-chair AANHPI Diabetes Coalition, a large national advocacy group aiming to improve diabetes prevention and management in Asian Americans. In 2018, he was elected a Fellow of the American Association for the Advancement of Science in the biological sciences section.

== Research ==
King’s research focuses on finding the causes of diabetic complications. He founded the Medalist Study to investigate new treatments for diabetic complications, and to understand the reasons for the high rate of diabetes in Asian Americans. His laboratory studies the molecular mechanisms that cause vascular complications caused by hyperglycemia and insulin resistance. He discovered that VEGF is an important causal factor in the severe form of diabetic eye disease. King´s laboratory has played a pioneering role in the characterization of endogenous protective factors originating in tissues which can neutralize the toxic effect of hyperglycemia and insulin resistance.

== Awards ==
- 1986 - Elected Fellow of the American Society of Clinical Investigation
- 1988 - Lilly Clinical Scholar and Visiting Professor
- 1989-1990 - Cogan Award, Association for Research in Vision and Ophthalmology
- 1996 - Alcon Research Institute Award
- 1996 - Stadie Memorial Award and Lectureship, Philadelphia Affiliate of the American Diabetes Association
- 2000 - Josiah Brown Lecture, University of California Medical School, Los Angeles, CA
- 2010 - Harry Lee Memorial Lecture; Chinese American Medical Association
- 2011 - Ramon and Victoria Lim Medical Science Lectureship; University of Iowa, Carver College of Medicine, Iowa City, Iowa
- 2011 and 2012 - Harold Amos Faculty Diversity Award; Harvard University, Harvard Medical School, Boston, MA
- 2014 - 32nd Annual Award of the Chinese Hospital Board of Trustees and Medical Staff of San Francisco
- 2015 - Edwin Bierman Lecture Award, American Diabetes Association
- 2016 - JDRF Mary Tyler Moore/S. Robert Levine Award for Clinical Research, Juvenile Diabetes Research Foundation
- 2017 - Juvenile Diabetes Foundation International "Donald Silver Excellence in Research"
- 2018 - Elected Fellow of the American Association for the Advancement of Science (AAAS)
- 2019 - Antonio Champalimaud Vision Award, Champalimaud Foundation, Champalimaud Centre for the Unknown, Lisbon, Portugal
- 2022 - Thomas J. Beatson, Jr. Chair Professor of Diabetes at Harvard Medical Scho
- 2024 - Rongxiang Xu, MD Keynote Lecture, Diabetic Lower Extremity Symposium
