= George King (cricketer, born 1857) =

English cricketer (1857–1944)

George Lionel King (6 April 1857 – 29 June 1944) was an English cricketer active from 1880 to 1881 who played for Sussex. He was born and died in Brighton. He appeared in six first-class matches as a righthanded batsman who scored 112 runs with a highest score of 29 and was an occasional wicketkeeper. His father George W. King also played for Sussex.

King was educated at Rugby School and Trinity College, Cambridge. He joined the 1st Volunteer Battalion of the Royal Sussex Regiment and during the First World War was second in command of the 3rd Battalion.
