= Priscilla White (physician) =

American diabetologist (1900–1989)

- Born: March 17, 1900; Boston, Massachusetts
- Died: December 16, 1989 (aged 89); Ashland, Massachusetts
- Education: Tufts University Medical School
- Occupation: Diabetes researcher
- Known for: Pioneer in the treatment of diabetes during pregnancy

Priscilla White (March 17, 1900 – December 16, 1989) was a pioneer in the treatment of diabetes during pregnancy and type 1 diabetes. She was also a founding member of the Joslin Diabetes Center.

== Biography ==
White was born in Boston, Massachusetts, but while she was a baby her parents divorced and she was living in Woolaston. She graduated from Quincy High School in Massachiusetts. She attended Radcliffe College before transferring to Tufts University Medical School, where she graduated third in her class in the year 1923. At the time, Harvard Medical School did not accept women. She served her internship at Worcester Memorial Hospital.

In 1924, Dr. Elliott P. Joslin approached her to ask if she would work on testing new medications to treat diabetes at Lahey Clinic. Unbeknown to her, she was working with the earliest forms of insulin. She joined the practice of Joslin the following year in 1924 and was immediately assigned to the challenging task of caring for children with diabetes.

She felt her greatest contribution to the field of diabetes was her work delineating the heredity, stages and treatment of type 1 diabetes, “although the pregnancy work was more spectacular.” White wrote Diabetes in Childhood and Adolescence in 1932, and played an integral role in the establishment and operation of The Clara Barton Birthplace Camp for Diabetic Girls, often driving 65 miles to reach the camp after a full day of work.

== Works ==
She began her research on pregnancy in about 1928 with Joslin as her mentor in a father-daughter relationship. She showed the importance of strict blood glucose control and early delivery in ensuring the healthy delivery of newborns. In 1949, she introduced the White Classification of Diabetic Pregnancies, which classified patients according to their level of risk and tailored their treatment protocol accordingly. Levels of risk were determined by age at onset, duration, presence of atherosclerotic vascular disease and renal complications. In 1968, she added proliferative retinopathy to the risk factors. This classification was widely adopted and allowed doctors to partially predict the course of a woman with diabetes during pregnancy and the chances of newborn survival.

When White began working at Joslin, the fetal success rate was 54 percent; when she retired in 1974, it would be over 90 percent. During her 50 years of work, White managed the deliveries of over 2200 women with diabetes and the supervision of some 10,000 cases of type 1 diabetes. After her retirement, she kept in touch with colleagues and continued to be involved in the wider community of diabetics, chiefly through caring for and working on the emotional problems of young people with diabetes.

She was the first woman to be invited to give the Banting Memorial Lecture and to receive the Banting Medal, the highest scientific award of the American Diabetes Association. Hobart and William Smith College cited her as one of the twelve outstanding women physicians of the world.

White died of a heart attack on December 16, 1989, in Ashland, Massachusetts. She was survived by her five dachshunds.
