= George H. King (politician) =

North Carolina politician

George H. King was an African-American shoemaker and state legislator in North Carolina. He represented Warren County, North Carolina in the North Carolina House of Representatives from 1872 to 1874. He was also elected to a seat in 1881.

== See also ==
- African American officeholders from the end of the Civil War until before 1900
