= George King (Australian footballer) =

Australian rules footballer

Personal information
- Full name: George Linton King
- Born: 5 October 1892; Melbourne, Victoria
- Died: 5 May 1976 (aged 83); Heidelberg, Victoria
- Original team: Fitzroy Juniors
- Height: 185 cm (6 ft 1 in)
- Weight: 84 kg (185 lb)
- Positions: Ruck, key forward

Playing career^{1}
Years	Club	Games (Goals)
1913, 1915–16	Fitzroy	13 (4)
- ^{1} Playing statistics correct to the end of 1916.

George Linton King (5 October 1892 – 5 May 1976) was an Australian rules footballer who played with Fitzroy in the Victorian Football League (VFL).

The eldest son of George Linton King and Margaret Newton, he grew up in South Melbourne before commencing his football career with the Fitzroy Juniors. He was a tall player in his era, and played in the ruck and as a key forward. Notable events in his short career included being struck by Arthur Bettles in 1915 and scoring two goals in a game against Collingwood in 1916.

His football career ended when he was mobilised for service in World War I, departing for Europe in late 1916.
