= George King (cricketer, born 1822) =

English cricketer

George William King (15 June 1822 – 22 December 1881) was an English cricketer active from 1842 to 1864 who played for Sussex. He was born in London and died in Hove. He appeared in nineteen first-class matches as a lefthanded batsman who scored 166 runs with a highest score of 25. His son George L. King also played for Sussex.

King was educated at Eton and Trinity College, Cambridge. He was president of Cambridge Union in 1843.
