= George Edward King =

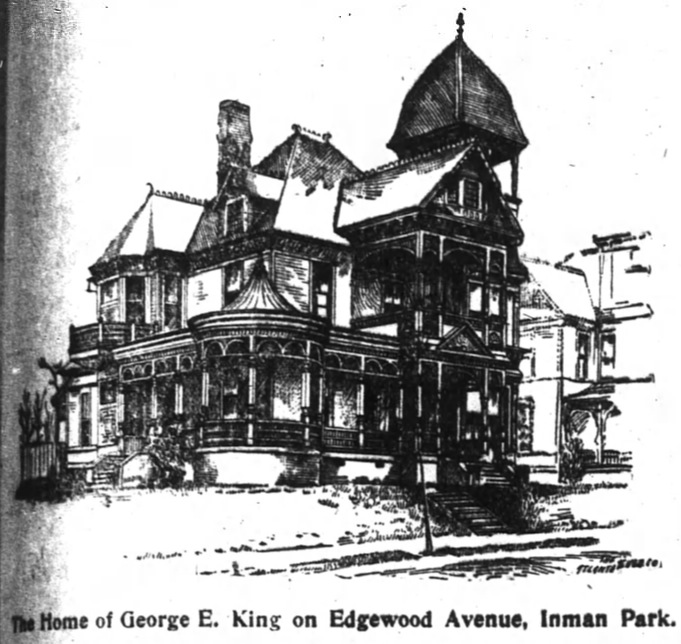
King mansion in Inman Park, 1896

George Edward King (November 3, 1851, Macon, Georgia - Mar 1934, Atlanta) was a prominent Atlanta hardware mogul. He made his fortune building up the King Hardware Company. He bought up at least four major competitors from the first decade of the 1900s through the 1920s. King had his mansion in the Inman Park neighborhood of Atlanta.
