= Junius Kellogg =

American basketball player, coach, and civil servant

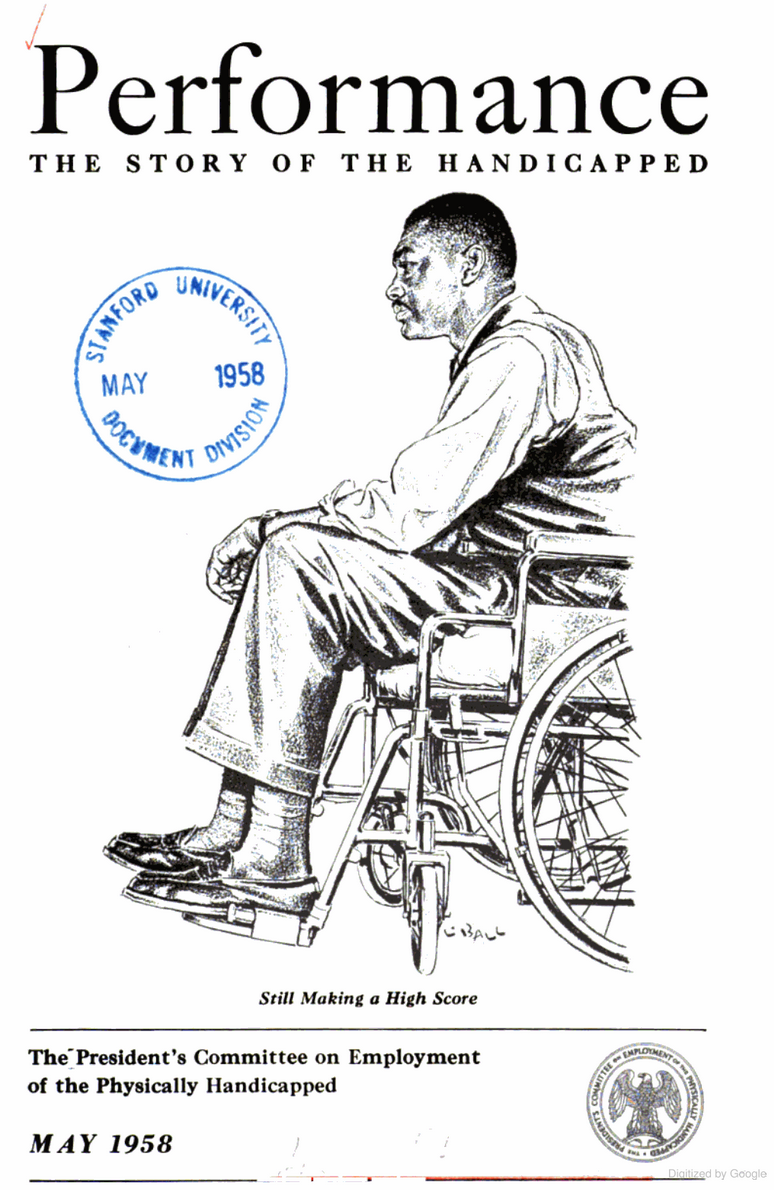
- Junius Kellogg on the cover of the federal publication Performance (May 1958)
- Born: March 16, 1927; Portsmouth, Virginia, U.S.
- Died: September 16, 1998 (aged 71); The Bronx, New York, U.S.
- Occupations: Basketball player, coach

Junius Kellogg (March 16, 1927 – September 16, 1998) was an American basketball player, coach, and civil servant. He was the first African-American to play college basketball for Manhattan College. While playing for the Jaspers, Kellogg became known for his role in helping to expose the 1951 college basketball point-shaving scandal of 1950–51.

== Early life ==
Kellogg was from Portsmouth, Virginia, the eldest of the twelve children of Theodore Kellogg and Lucy Kellogg. He graduated from I.C.Norcom High School.

== College career ==
In 1951, Kellogg, a standout 6'8" center, was offered a $1,000 bribe to shave points before a game against DePaul. Although he was working for minimum wage at a frozen custard shop near campus, he refused to take it, reporting the solicitation to his coach, Ken Norton. Norton sent him to the district attorney, Frank Hogan. To get evidence about the corruption, he wore a wire when he was again approached in a nearby bar. His whistle blowing touched off the largest college betting scandal in American history. Ultimately, the investigation involved thirty-two players from seven colleges and encompassed 86 games between 1947 and 1950, including three stars from the 1950 City College of New York team. CCNY had won both the National Invitation Tournament and the NCAA Tournament, in 1950, the only time that has ever been accomplished.

== Car accident and later life ==
Kellogg left college for a stint in the Army, serving in Korea. He then returned to Manhattan College, where he doubled up on courses. He graduated in 1953 and began playing for the Harlem Globetrotters. In 1954, he sustained a cervical spinal cord injury in an automobile accident and was paralyzed. Three fellow Globetrotters were unscathed during the accident.

Kellogg received treatment at the Bronx Veterans Administration Hospital in New York City. He became an ardent supporter of wheelchair athletics. He coached the Pan Am Jets as well as the Brooklyn Whirlaways. He was head coach of the USA Stoke Mandeville Games team as well as the head coach of the 1964 US Paralympic Basketball Team where the USA team won the gold medal. He was inducted into the National Wheelchair Basketball Association's hall of fame in 1981. In 2000, Kellogg was inducted into the Virginia Sports Hall of Fame.

Kellogg served for many years on the board of directors of Eastern Paralyzed Veterans Association (later the United Spinal Association) and worked for New York City from 1966 until his death in 1998. He served at the first deputy commissioner and director of strategic planning for the Community Development Agency. He received an honorary Doctor of Laws degree from his alma mater Manhattan College in 1997.

== Personal life and legacy ==
Kellogg married a social worker, Clementine Riggsbee, in 1959. He died in 1998, at the age of 71, at the Bronx VA Medical Center. Before his death, Kellogg would briefly appear in the HBO documentary film City Dump: The Story of the 1951 CCNY Basketball Scandal documenting his part in helping expose the scandal to the greater public. In 1999, a New York City youth gymnasium was named after Kellogg.
