= Nicholas J. Cifarelli =

Nicholas John Cifarelli
- Born: August 22, 1928; Queens, New York City
- Died: December 25, 2005 (aged 77)
- Education: Georgetown University School of Medicine
- Occupation: physician
- Known for: Bioethics, Nephrology
- Medical career
- Institutions: Flushing Hospital Medical Center, Bronx VA Hospital,

Nicholas John Cifarelli, M.D. (August 22, 1928 – December 25, 2005) was an Italian-American physician. He is known for starting the first bioethics advisory committee in the United States.

== Early life ==
Cifarelli was born in Queens, New York, on August 22, 1928. Nicholas, at a very young age showed an appreciation for fine arts. He viewed sculpture at his uncle's foundry, Roman Bronze, Inc. Later, he furthered his education in the arts, working eight years at the Metropolitan Opera, and was privileged to see every classical ballet the opera presented. This exposure created a deep love of the classics and was his inspiration to become a sculptor, where he later incorporated the time for this interest while practicing medicine.

== Education ==
Cifarelli began as an undergraduate in 1946 at Saint Peter's College (New Jersey). He studied chemistry, was a standout pitcher on the baseball team and graduated with a Bachelor of Science degree in 1949. Soon after he attended Georgetown University School of Medicine, where he pursued a medical education. In 1954 he graduated with a medical degree.

Later, Cifarelli pursued his interest in sculpture, where he studied under Professor Salvatore at Columbia University in 1964. He continued his education in this subject at Queens College in 1965. In 1971 he completed an extension course in sculpture at UCLA. He also took sculpture courses at Pasadena City College in Pasadena, California, from 1972 to 1973.

== Medical residency and naval career ==
After receiving his medical degree from Georgetown University, Cifarelli went back to Queens, New York, to start his medical internship at the Flushing Hospital Medical Center. After completing his internship he started his medical residency, choosing the specialty of internal medicine at Flushing Hospital Medical Center.

After finishing his medical residency Cifarelli joined the United States Navy as a medical officer. He was stationed in Coronado, California. After finishing his military service he relocated back to Queens to begin a medical career as a private practice physician. After he gained some experience in private practice he decided to further his medical education and began his fellowship (medicine) in nephrology (under J.E. Cimino, M.D.) at the Bronx VA Hospital, in the Bronx, New York.

== Private practice career ==
Cifarelli practiced medicine in New York City until 1968. In 1968 he moved to Los Angeles. Throughout his medical career in Los Angeles he was elected chief of staff at several different hospitals in the area. He also held numerous other positions during his career. In 1985 he was granted the title of clinical assistant professor in medicine from the University of California, Los Angeles. In 1994 the San Gabriel Valley Medical Center named the medical library in his name to show their appreciation for the dedication Cifarelli put forth throughout his career.

Cifarelli was elected a Fellow of the American College of Physicians in 1969.

He retired in 1996.

== Bioethics advisory committee ==
He became well known in 1984 when he pioneered the first bioethics advisory committee in the United States at the San Gabriel Valley Medical Center. Cifarelli maintained a "pull the plug" mentality throughout his medical career. He believed the patient and their family should not have to suffer through debilitating illnesses when there was no quality of life.

== Sculpture ==
Sculpture was one of Cifarelli's passions. Cifarelli completed a lifelike sculpture of Rudolf Nureyev, the world-renowned ballet dancer; the head was presented to Nureyev at the Greek Theatre (Los Angeles). Some of Cifarelli's work has also been showcased at The Sculptors III Gallery in Palm Springs, California.

== Death ==
Cifarelli died Christmas Day, 2005, after battling an illness. At the time of his diagnosis he stated that he did not want to be put on life support, which reflected the views that he stressed during his career. Previous to his death he resided in San Marino, California, with his family.
