= Victor Herbert (hematologist) =

American hematologist (1927–2002)

Victor Herbert (February 22, 1927 – November 19, 2002) was an American hematologist who did ground-breaking work on folate and how its deficiency led to megaloblastic anemia and was a proponent of accurate and responsible nutrition information.

== Career ==
His post at the end of his career was Professor of Medicine at the Mount Sinai School of Medicine in New York and Chief of Mount Sinai's Hematology and Nutrition Research Laboratory in the Bronx Veterans Affairs Medical Center.

His self experimentation to prove the health benefits of folic acid by living on diet of thrice-boiled chicken, marshmallows and jelly was reported on in the third episode of the BBC series the Medical Mavericks.

== Military service ==
Herbert served in four wars: World War II, the Korean War, the Vietnam War, and the first Gulf War. On retirement his rank was Lt. Col. (Green Berets).

== Criticism of nutrition quackery ==
Herbert was critical of alternative medicine claims and nutrition quackery.

He was the author of Vitamins and `Health' Foods: The Great American Hustle with Stephen Barrett and the book Nutrition Cultism. The latter was described by The New England Journal of Medicine as "a must for all readers who value the importance of nutrition in public health but are chagrined by the pretenders who exploit the public with food frauds, dietary cures, and nutrition nonsense." His book The Vitamin Pushers (1994), also co-authored with Barrett was an exposé of quacks in the health food industry, based on more than twenty years of research.

== Awards ==
- McCollum Award (1972), American Society of Clinical Nutrition
- Middleton Award (1978), Veterans’ Administration
- Elected foreign member of the Finnish Society of Sciences and Letters (1982)
- Robert H. Hermon Award (1986), American Society of Clinical Nutrition
- Honorary Membership Award (1993), American Dietetic Association

== Selected publications ==
Herbert authored over 800 scientific papers, many book chapters, and several books.

Books

- Nutrition Cultism: Facts and Fictions (1980, reprinted 1984)
- Vitamins and "Health" Foods: The Great American Hustle] (1981, reprinted 1985) [with Stephen Barrett]
- The Vitamin Pushers: How the "Health Food" Industry is Selling America a Bill of Goods (Prometheus Books, 1994) [with Stephen Barrett]

Papers

- Herbert, V. (1959) Mechanism of intrinsic factor action in everted sacs of rat small intestine. J. Clin. Investig. 38:102-109. 2.
- Herbert, V. & Zalusky, R. (1962) Interrelations of vitamin B-12 and folic acid metabolism: folic acid clearance studies. J. Clin. Investig. 41:1263-1276. 3.
- Herbert, V. (1962) Experimental nutritional folate deficiency in man. Transactions of the Association of American Physicians 75: 307-320.
- Herbert, V., Baker, H., Frank, O., Pasher, I., Sobotka, H. & Wasserman, L. R. (1960) The measurement of folic acid activity in serum: a diagnostic aid in the differentiation of the megaloblastic anaemias. Blood 15:228-235.
- Waxman, S., Schreiber, C. & Herbert, V. (1971) Radioisotopic assay for measurement of serum folate levels. Blood 38:219-228.
- Herbert, V. & Gottlieb, C. W. (1966) Haemoglobin-coated charcoal assay for serum vitamin in B-12. Blood 28:130-132.
- Das, K. C. & Herbert, V. (1978) The lymphocyte as a marker of past nutritional status: persistence of abnormal lymphocyte deoxyuridine (dU) suppression test and chromosomes in patients with past deficiency of folate and vitamin B-12. British Journal of Haematology 38: 219-233.
- Herbert, V. (1981). Nutrition Cultism. The Western Journal of Medicine 135 (3): 252–256.
- Herzlich, B. & Herbert, V. (1988) Depletion of serum holotranscobalamin II. An early sign of negative vitamin B-12 balance. Laboratory Investigation 58: 332–337.
