= United Spinal Association =

US non-profit organization

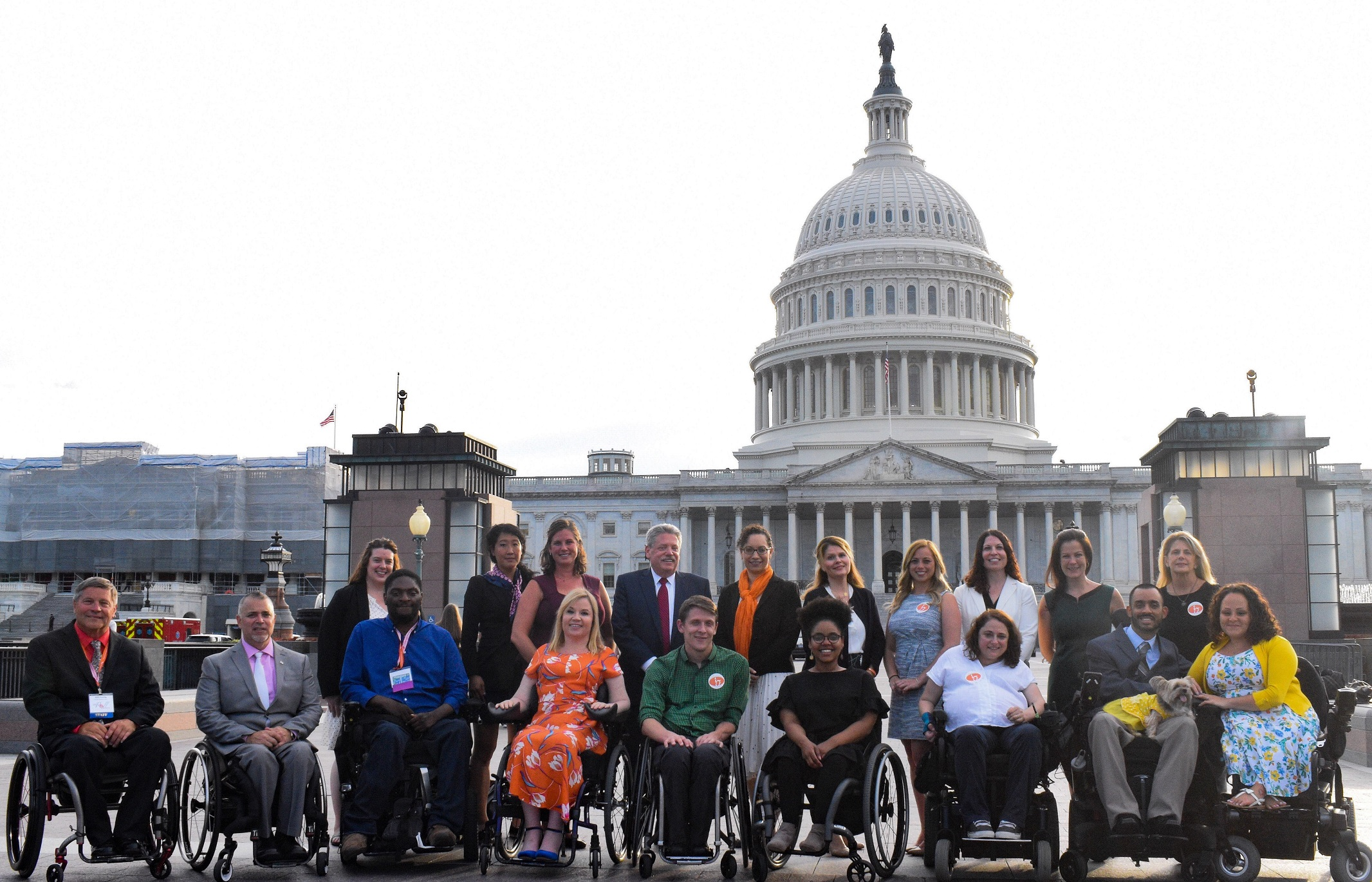
United Spinal Association staff and members at the 2019 Roll on Capitol Hill annual disability-advocacy event

United Spinal Association is a nonprofit membership, disability-rights and veterans'-service organization, based in Queens, New York.

It was formed in 1946 as Eastern Paralyzed Veterans Association by a group of paralyzed World War II veterans from New York City.

United Spinal Association is recognized by the United States Department of Veterans Affairs (VA) as a veterans' service organization; as such, United Spinal Association is authorized to prepare, present and prosecute claims for veterans benefits from the local VA regional-office level to the Supreme Court of the United States. United Spinal Association's veterans service program is entitled VetsFirst.

== History ==
In 1948, seventy smembers of the Eastern Paralyzed Veterans Association (EPVA) held a public demonstration in New York City's Grand Central Terminal to gather signatures supporting the nation's first accessible-housing bill (Public Law 702) to get federal funds to build accessible homes for paralyzed veterans.

In 1968, EPVA advocated for equal access to federally funded buildings and facilities for wheelchair users and all Americans living with disabilities, leading to the passage of Architectural Barriers Act of 1968.

In 1970, executive director James J. Peters set out to expose the deplorable conditions on the spinal-cord-injury units at the Bronx Veterans Hospital, culminating in a Life magazine exposé, the creation of the VA's dedicated Spinal Cord Injury Service. In addition, the hospital was modernized, and is now known as the James J. Peters VA Medical Center.

In 1987, in conjunction with Paralyzed Veterans of America, United Spinal Association helped found and continues to underwrite spinal-cord-injury research at the Center for Neuroscience and Regeneration Research at the Yale School of Medicine in New Haven, Connecticut. This center remains under direction of Dr. Stephen Waxman.

United Spinal played a role in writing portions of the Americans with Disabilities Act of 1990, the landmark civil-rights law that prohibits discrimination based on disability.

The group's past and present members include Lex Frieden, Junius Kellogg and Frank Genese.

In 2024, the United Spinal Association partnered with TandemStride and other groups as a part of TandemStride's new peer-to-peer network. The media reported that this network was to provide support to those suffering from traumatic injuries.

== Programs ==
United Spinal's Spinal Cord Resource Center offers visitors the opportunity to submit questions to experienced information specialists on any aspect of living with spinal cord injuries or disorders or get information and resources to resolve a situation that impacts health, independence and quality of life.

United Spinal offers members access to local chapter and peer support groups that promote inclusion and independence, organize local events and projects, advocate for rights and accessibility, and offer information and support.

Other services and programs include:

- VetsFirst: advice and advocacy services for veterans
- Accessibility Services
- Advocacy
- Pathways to Employment program
- Tech Access program
- Emergency preparedness and disaster relief

== See also ==
- Disability rights in the United States
- List of disability organizations
- National Spinal Cord Injury Association
