= Giulio Maria Pasinetti =

Italian-American neurologist

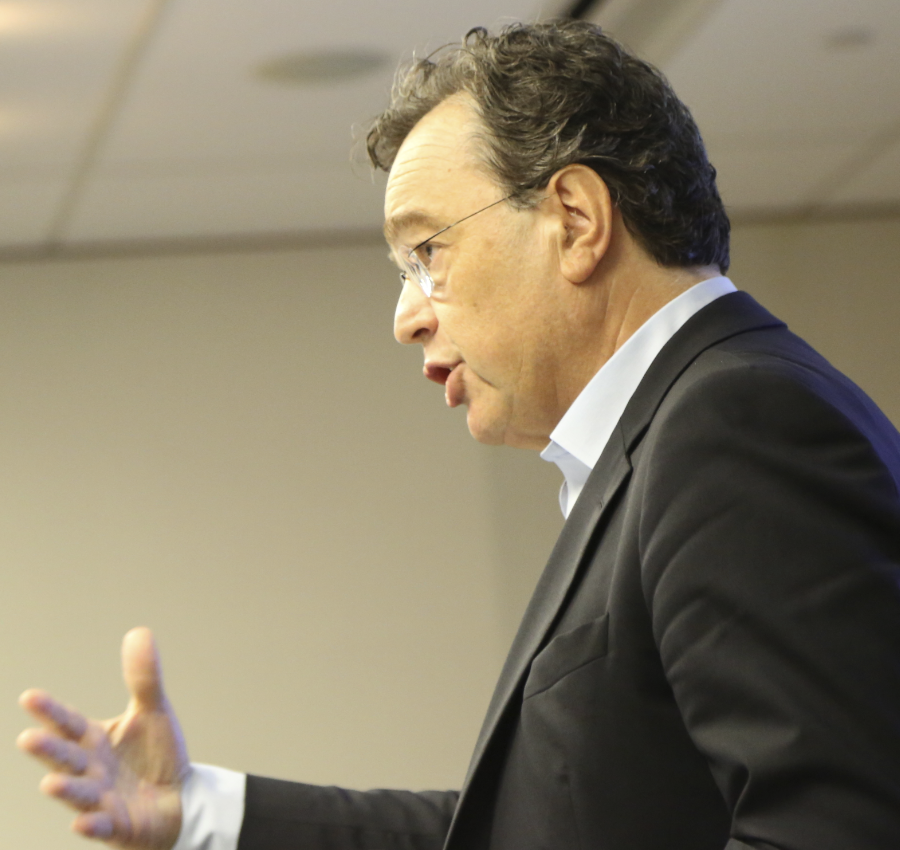
- Dr. Pasinetti presents: "Innate Neuroimmune Priming: Mechanisms and Potential Imaging Biomarkers" at TMII's STRIVE Seminar Series at Mount Sinai, YC in September 2018
- Education: University of Milan
- Employer: Icahn School of Medicine at Mount Sinai
- Known for: Biological psychiatry, Alzheimer's disease
- Website: http://www.mountsinai.org/profiles/giulio-m-pasinetti

Giulio Maria Pasinetti is the Program Director of the Center on Molecular Integrative Neuroresilience and is the Saunders Family Chair in Neurology at the Icahn School of Medicine at Mount Sinai (ISMMS) in New York City. Pasinetti is a Professor of Neurology, Psychiatry, Neuroscience, and Geriatrics and Palliative Medicine at ISMMS.

As the Program Director of the NIH / NCCIH funded P50 Center on Molecular Integrative Neuroresilience, Pasinetti's focus is on understanding the molecular mechanisms and pathophysiology that may be at the basis of stress-induced mood disorders, including anxiety, depression, and other neuropsychiatric disorders, and their influence on cognitive dysfunction.

At the Veterans Health Administration, Pasinetti is the Director of the Basic and Biomedical Research and Training Program, Geriatric Research, Education, and Clinical Center (GRECC), as well as the Director of the Translational Neuroscience Laboratories at the James J. Peters Veterans Affairs Medical Center (JJPVAMC).

Pasinetti has an h-index of 81, with over 20,000 citations. He has published over 250 papers indexed in PubMed, as well as 6 book chapters.

== Biography ==
=== Education ===
Pasinetti received an M.D. from the Milan University School of Medicine (1982) and a Ph.D. in Pharmacology from the University of Milan (1988). He was a Research Fellow (Neuropharmacology, 1983-1984) at the University of Milan. Upon moving to the United States, he worked as a Research Associate (Neurogerontology, 1984-1988) and, eventually, as a Senior Research Associate (Neurogerontology, 1989-1990) at the University of Southern California in Los Angeles.

=== Career ===
Pasinetti began his career as an assistant professor at the California School of Gerontology and Biological Sciences at the University of Southern California (1990–1995) in Los Angeles. Since 1996, he has been a faculty member of the Icahn School of Medicine at Mount Sinai where he served as the Aidekman Family Chair and Professor in Neurology until 2009. Pasinetti was also the chief of the Friedman Brain Institute Center of Excellence for Novel Approaches to Neurodiagnostics and Neurotherapeutics, as well as, from 2008 to 2014, the director and principal investigator of the NIH-funded Center of Excellence for Research on Complementary and Alternative Medicine (CERC) in Alzheimer's disease.

=== Awards ===
Dr. Pasinetti's awards and honors include the Mount Sinai School of Medicine Faculty Council Award for Academic Excellence, the Charles Dana Alliance for Brain Initiatives Award from the Dana Foundation, the Foundation Queen Sofia of Spain Research Center award on Alzheimer's Disease, the Research Career Scientist Developmental Award from the Veterans Health Administration, the Zenith Award from the Alzheimer's Association, the Temple Foundation Discovery Award from the Alzheimer's Association, the Nathan W. & Margaret T. Shock Aging Research Foundation Award from the Gerontological Society of America, the Turken Family fellowship from the Alzheimer's Association (Los Angeles Chapter) and the Nathan Shock New Investigator Award of the Gerontological Society of America. Dr. Pasinetti was also awarded the 2017 Mary Swartz Rose Senior Investigator Award by The American Society for Nutrition and the American Society for Nutrition Foundation. Most recently, Dr. Pasinetti was named an Honorary Fellow of The University of Bergamo (Università degli Studi di Bergamo).

=== Grants and Research ===
Pasinetti investigates the biological processes that occur when, during aging, subjects with normal cognitive function convert into the very earliest stages of Alzheimer's disease (AD) and then to frank dementia. He identified type 2 diabetes (T2D) as one of the major risk factors that might affect AD neuropathology and synaptic plasticity in part through epigenetic mechanisms. By conducting genome wide association studies to clarify the molecular mechanisms in subjects with T2D who might be predisposed to the onset of Alzheimer's disease, Pasinetti found that a subpopulation of individuals with T2D have a genetic predisposition to AD based on the evidence of shared common T2D/AD single nucleotide polymorphisms in gene pathways involved in chromatin modification enzymes, among others. Through this research, Pasinetti and his colleagues provided the basis for novel therapeutic targets towards the preservation of cognitive health in a subset of T2D subjects at risk for developing AD.

With his group, Pasinetti has led research investigations on the neuromolecular mechanisms underlying age-related cognitive decline, dementia, and stress-induced psychological and cognitive impairment with the goal of utilizing repurposed natural products, specifically polyphenols, to promote resilience to such conditions. With this in mind, Pasinetti initiated a drug repurposing study for AD, screening FDA-approved drugs and natural compounds for amyloid-lowering and anti-Aβ aggregation activities, and identified candidates for in vivo testing in AD animal models. As a result of this study, Pasinetti's laboratory identified antihypertensive drugs lacking cardiovascular side effects but with enhanced anti-Aβ oligomerization activity. Pasinetti's research has also validated that repurposing drugs that have already been well-characterized in terms of tolerability and safety profile may have several advantages over novel drugs. These studies provide new information about the potentially detrimental role of commonly prescribed drugs that can be used as a reference for physicians to consider, particularly when treating chronic degenerative disorders such as AD.

Following these findings, as Chief of the Friedman Brain Institute Center of Excellence for Novel Approaches to Neurodiagnostics and Neurotherapeutics, Pasinetti developed drug discovery programs for Alzheimer's disease. Here, he led a primary translational Center to determine whether interventions which appear to work in the preclinical animal model of the disease also show promise in treating patients who have the disease.

Pasinetti is the Director of the NIH funded Botanical Center in Neuroresilience. This Center supports three major projects which are being conducted through interdisciplinary collaborative efforts from Mount Sinai Hospital's Department of Neuroscience, Department of Neurology, Department of Genetics and Genomic Sciences, and the Friedman Brain Institute. One project is the efficacy of using polyphenols specifically as dietary supplements to promote resilience against stressful events and clarifying the role of the microbiome at the genomic level in the promotion of cognitive and psychological health. This research is leading to safe and efficacious treatments of dietary botanical supplements to promote resilience in response to psychological and cognitive impairment.

In a study released on February 2, 2018, scientists from the Icahn School of Medicine at Mount Sinai, led by Dr. Giulio Maria Pasinetti, described an extensive analysis of two novel grape-derived phytochemicals, or natural essential nutrients, dihydrocaffeic acid (DHCA) and malvidin-3'-O-glucoside (Mal-gluc), which might be developed as therapeutic agents for the treatment of depression. The study demonstrated that DHCA reversed improper epigenetic modifications that have been shown to promote the DNA transcription of numerous pro-inflammatory genes, such as interleukin 6 (IL-6). Mal-gluc was found to increase the transcription of the Rac1 gene, which influences the expression of genes responsible for synaptic plasticity in the brain. It was demonstrated that treatment with both DHCA and Mal-gluc is effective in attenuating depression-like phenotypes in a mouse model of increased systemic inflammation induced by transplantation of cells from the bone marrow of stress-susceptible mice. This Mount Sinai study provides novel preclinical evidence supporting the targeting of multiple key disease mechanisms through DNA epigenetic modification for the treatment of depression and strongly supports the need to test and identify novel compounds that target alternative pathologic mechanisms, such as inflammation and synaptic maladaptation, for individuals who are resistant to currently available treatments.

With his involvement at the Veterans Administration, Pasinetti and his lab identified biomarkers to help diagnose the two signature injuries of the recent wars in Iraq and Afghanistan: mild traumatic brain injury (mTBI) and post-traumatic stress disorder (PTSD). The focus was on four specific non-coding miRNA which were all found at significantly lower levels in those Veterans who had comorbid TBI plus PTSD, when compared to subjects who had only PTSD. The availability of such biomarkers could provide more precise benchmarks and outcome measures in clinical trials of different TBI or PTSD therapies.

Pasinetti's lab is now working on tracing "downstream" molecular pathways in preclinical rodent models of mTBI, to eventually tie them back to TBI or PTSD symptoms and allow for identification of potential new drug targets to be further developed in the clinical setting.

Taken together, the focus of Dr. Pasinetti's research determining the molecular basis of neurodegenerative disorders and TBI to provide targets for novel therapies has the ultimate goal of identifying unique treatment strategies that can be translated to improve pharmacological treatment in clinical care.

== Publications (Partial List) ==
- Westfall, S; Caracci, F; Estill, M; Frolinger, T; Shen, L; Pasinetti, GM (2021). "Chronic Stress-Inuduced Depression and Anxiety Modulated by Gut-Brain-Axis Immunity". Frontiers in Immunology. 12 670500. doi:10.3389/fimmu.2021.670500. PMC 8264434. PMID 34248950.
- Sebastian-Valverde, M; Wu, H; Rahim, M; Pasinetti, GM (2021). "Discovery and characterization of small molecule inhibitors of NLRP3 and NLRC4 inflammasomes". Journal of Biological Chemistry. 296 100597. doi:10.1016/j.jbc.2021.100597. PMC 8095128. PMID 33781745.
- Smith, C; Trageser, KJ; Wu, H; Pasinetti, GM (2021). "Anxiolytic effects of NLRP3 inflammasome inhibition in a model of chronic sleep deprivation". Transl Psychiatry. 11, 52 (1): 52. doi:10.1038/s41398-020-01189-3. PMC 7809257. PMID 33446652.
- Westfall, S; Caracci, F; Zhao, D; Simon, J; Pasinetti, GM (2020). "Microbiota metabolites modulate the T helper 17 to regulatory T cell (Th17/Treg) imbalance promoting resilience to stress-induced anxiety- and depressive-like behaviors". Brain, Behavior, and Immunity. 91: 350–368. doi:10.1016/j.bbi.2020.10.013. PMC 7986984. PMID 33096252.
- Westfall, S; Pasinetti, GM (2019). "The gut microbiota links dietary polyphenols with management of psychiatric mood disorders". Front. Neurosci. 13:1196: 1196. doi:10.3389/fnins.2019.01196. PMC 6848798. PMID 31749681.
- Westfall, S; Iqbal, U; Sebastian, M; Pasinetti, GM (2019). "Gut Microbiota Mediated Allostasis Prevents Stress-induced Neuroinflammatory Risk Factors of Alzheimer's Disease". Prog Mol Biol Transl Sci. Progress in Molecular Biology and Translational Science. 168: 147–181. doi:10.1016/bs.pmbts.2019.06.013. ISBN 978-0-12-817874-4. PMID 31699313. S2CID 198299718.
- Wang, Jun; Hodes, Georgia E.; Hongxing, Zhang; Pasinetti, GM (2018). "Epigenetic modulation of inflammation and synaptic plasticity promotes resilience against stress in mice". Nature Communications. 9 (1): 477. Bibcode:2018NatCo...9..477W. doi:10.1038/s41467-017-02794-5. PMC 5797143. PMID 29396460.
- Pasinetti, GM; Bilski, A; Zhao, W; Wang, J (2013). "Sirtuins as therapeutic targets of ALS". Cell Research. 23 (9): 1073–1074. doi:10.1038/cr.2013.94. PMC 3760621. PMID 23856645.
- Santa-Maria, I; Varghese, M; Księżak-Reding, H; Dzhun, A; Wang, J; Pasinetti, GM (June 2012). "Paired Helical Filaments from Alzheimer's Disease Brain Induce Intracellular Accumulation of Tau in Aggresomes". J Biol Chem. 287 (24): 20522–33. doi:10.1074/jbc.M111.323279. PMC 3370237. PMID 22496370.
- Wang, J; Ferruzzi, MG; Ho, L; Blount, J; Janle, E; Gong, B; Pan, Y; Raftery, D; Arrieta-Cruz, I; Sharma, V; Cooper, B; Lobo, J; Simon, JE; Zhang, C; Cheng, A; Qian, X; Ono, K; Teplow, D; Pavlides, C; Dixon, R; Pasinetti, GM (April 2012). "Brain-targeted proanthocyanidin metabolites for Alzheimer's disease treatment". J Neurosci. 32 (15): 5144–5150. doi:10.1523/JNEUROSCI.6437-11.2012. PMC 3348654. PMID 22496560.
- Pasinetti, GM (September 2008). "Anti-inflammatory drugs fall short in Alzheimer's disease". Nature Medicine. 14 (9): 916. doi:10.1038/nm0908-916. PMID 18776882. S2CID 205381930.
