= Charles S. Lieber =

Belgian-American nutritionist (1931–2009)

Charles Saul Lieber (February 13, 1931 – March 1, 2009) was a Belgian-American clinical nutritionist who established that excess alcohol consumption can cause cirrhosis of the liver even in subjects who have an adequate diet, contradicting then-current scientific opinion.

== Early life ==
Lieber was born on February 13, 1931, in Antwerp, Belgium. In 1942, he was forced to flee with his family to France, and later Switzerland, as World War II bloomed. He spent most of the war with a childless Swiss family in Winterthur that had taken him in from a refugee camp. This family paid for him to attend a local elite Gymnasium, where he skipped a year to compensate for lost time in refugee camps. When Lieber returned to Belgium after the war, he was unable to obtain a high school diploma due to this skipped year. Lieber instead decided to drop out, pass a high school equivalency exam, and enroll in Pre-Medical School at the Free University of Brussels. While in college, a portion of his stomach was removed (subtotal gastrectomy) due to complications of a peptic ulcer. Following the completion of his bachelor's degree summa cum laude, Lieber went on to medical school, also at the University of Brussels, and graduated with his M.D. in 1955, also summa cum laude, the top-ranking medical student. While in medical school, Lieber's gastric ulcer led him to investigate its causes.

== Career ==
He continued research at University of Brussels after graduation, until a fellowship took him to Boston City Hospital and Harvard University. There he was troubled by the belief in the profession that cirrhosis in alcoholics was caused by malnutrition and not alcohol itself, having seen alcoholics in Belgium who had liver disease even with a proper diet and based on research by Dr. Charles Best (co-discoverer of insulin) that showed that alcohol had no greater an effect in rats than sugar water. Lieber pursued Best's theory that excessive amounts of alcohol damaged the liver.

Biological approach to alcoholism, research monograph (1980)

He was hired by Manhattan's Bellevue Hospital Center in 1963, where he successfully pleaded for a grant from the National Institutes of Health which would be used for his investigations on alcohol in baboons. He was admitted to the faculty of Bronx Veterans Affairs Medical Center and was appointed as a professor at the Mount Sinai School of Medicine in 1968, where he identified the biochemical processes used in the human body to metabolize alcohol. In a 1974 study, he showed that baboons who had been given a normal diet combined with the equivalent of about 750 millilitres (26 imp fl oz; 25 US fl oz) of alcohol daily for four years experienced cirrhosis, contradicting medical dogma that inadequate nutrition combined with alcoholism caused the disease. Other research showed that the effect of even social drinking on the liver can cause it to create toxic substances, increasing the sensitivity of even social drinkers to acetaminophen, anesthetics and certain solvents.

Lieber found that administering antibiotics to alcoholics with liver disease caused by their condition would have less ammonia converted from urea in their stomach, which he credited to bacteria in the stomach that he had seen using his microscope and that had been killed by the antibiotic treatment. As the medical wisdom at the time stated that bacteria could not survive in the stomach's acidic environment, his research was largely ignored. It was not until the 1980s, when researchers Dr. Barry Marshall and Dr. Robin Warren identified the bacteria Helicobacter pylori in the stomach as a cause of ulcers and stomach cancer, for which they won the 2005 Nobel Prize in Physiology or Medicine.

He pushed the National Council on Alcoholism and Drug Dependence to create the journal Alcoholism: Clinical and Experimental Research in 1977 as an academic journal for articles regarding alcohol abuse and its treatment, to disseminate research in a field that was minimized by other medical professionals who did not believe that alcohol research was a legitimate avenue for research and that there was nothing medicine could do to address the problems of alcoholism.

A 1990 study published in the New England Journal of Medicine showed that women feel greater effects than men from equivalent amounts of alcohol adjusted for body size due to lower amounts of a stomach enzyme that metabolizes the alcohol and keeps it from entering the bloodstream, though the study did not explain the cause of this enzymatic discrepancy. Lieber indicated that this finding might account for why women who become alcoholics are more likely to experience liver damage.

Other research performed by Lieber showed that hepatitis could be triggered by consumption of alcohol. He pioneered the therapeutic use of the coenzyme S-Adenosyl methionine as a therapeutic means to prevent liver toxicity.

== Death ==
Lieber died at age 78 on March 1, 2009 of stomach cancer at his home in Tenafly, New Jersey. Lieber was survived by his second wife, Dr. Maria Leo-Lieber, as well as three daughters, two sons and six grandchildren. His earlier marriage, to Adele Tornhadjm, ended in divorce.
