= The Neuroscientist =

- Language: English
- Edited by: Stephen G Waxman

Publication details
- History: 1995–present
- Publisher: SAGE Publications
- Frequency: Bi-monthly
- Impact factor: 7.519 (2020)

Standard abbreviations
- ISO 4: Neuroscientist

Indexing
- ISSN: 1073-8584
- LCCN: 96004298
- OCLC no.: 44513079

Links
- Journal homepage; Online access; Online archive

The Neuroscientist is a peer-reviewed academic journal that publishes papers in the field of Neurology and Neuroscience. The journal's editor is Stephen G Waxman (Yale University). It has been in publication since 1995 and is currently published by SAGE Publications.

== Scope ==
The Neuroscientist is aimed at basic neuroscientists, neurologists, neurosurgeons, and psychiatrists in research, academic, and clinical settings, reviewing new and emerging basic and clinical neuroscience research. The journal evaluates key trends in molecular, cellular, developmental, behavioral systems, and cognitive neuroscience in a disease-relevant format.

== Abstracting and indexing ==
The Neuroscientist is abstracted and indexed in, among other databases: SCOPUS, and the Social Sciences Citation Index. According to the Journal Citation Reports, its 2013/2014 impact factor is 6.837, ranking it 11 out of 194 journals in the category ‘Clinical Neurology’. and 25 out of 185 journals in the category ‘Clinical Neurology’.
