= Cimino fistula =

Surgical connection between a vein and artery during hemodialysis

An AV fistula.

A Cimino fistula, also Cimino-Brescia fistula, surgically created arteriovenous fistula and (less precisely) arteriovenous fistula (often abbreviated AV fistula or AVF), is a type of vascular access for hemodialysis. It is typically a surgically created connection between an artery and a vein in the arm, although there have been acquired arteriovenous fistulas which do not in fact demonstrate connection to an artery.

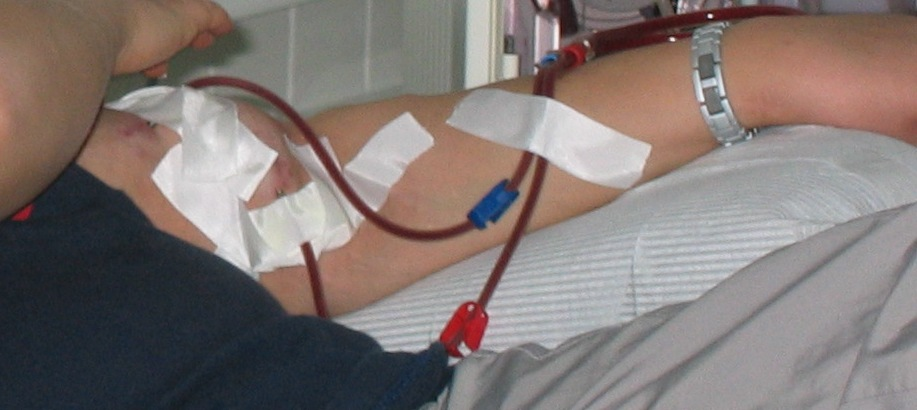
Surgically created AV fistula

== Structure ==
The radiocephalic arteriovenous fistula (RC-AVF) is a shortcut created between cephalic vein and radial artery at the wrist. It is the recommended first choice for hemodialysis access. However, after a period of usage, failures can occur. Possible causes for failure are stenosis and thrombosis especially in diabetics and those with low blood flow such as due to narrow vessels, arteriosclerosis and advanced age. Reported patency of fistulae after 1 year is about 60%, when primary failures were included.

Juxa-anastomotic site (venous segment that is between 2 and 5 cm distal to the anastomotic site) is the most common site of stenosis. One of the reasons affecting the rate of stenosis could be the anastomotic angle. In computational fluid dynamics study, the ideal anastomotic angle should be less than 30 degrees to ensure laminar flow of the blood, thus prolong the endothelial cell survival, and prevent smooth muscle proliferation within vessel wall, and clogging the vessel. However, in another study using angiographic images of the juxta-anastomotic sites, the ideal anastomotic angle of less than 46.5 degrees was obtained.

Surgically created AV fistulas work effectively because they:

- Have high volume flow rates (as blood takes the path of least resistance; it prefers the (low resistance) AV fistula over traversing (high resistance) capillary beds).
- Use native blood vessels, which, when compared to synthetic grafts, are less likely to develop stenoses and fail.

== History ==
The procedure was invented by doctors James Cimino and M. J. Brescia at the Bronx Veterans Administration Hospital in 1966. Before the Cimino fistula was invented, access was through a Scribner shunt, which consisted of a Teflon tube with a needle at each end. Between treatments, the needles were left in place and the tube allowed blood flow to reduce clotting. But Scribner shunts lasted only a few days to weeks. Frustrated by this limitation, James E. Cimino recalled his days as a phlebotomist (blood drawer) at New York City's Bellevue Hospital in the 1950s when Korean War veterans showed up with fistulas caused by trauma. Cimino recognized that these fistulas did not cause the patients harm and were easy places to get repeated blood samples. He convinced surgeon Kenneth Appell to create some in patients with chronic kidney failure and the result was a complete success. Scribner shunts were quickly replaced with Cimino fistulas, and they remain the most effective, longest-lasting method for long-term access to patients' blood for hemodialysis today.
