= United States Department of Veterans Affairs Police =

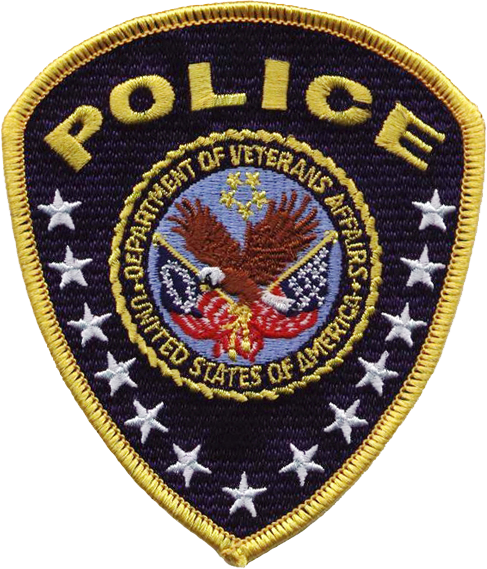
- Patch

- Seal

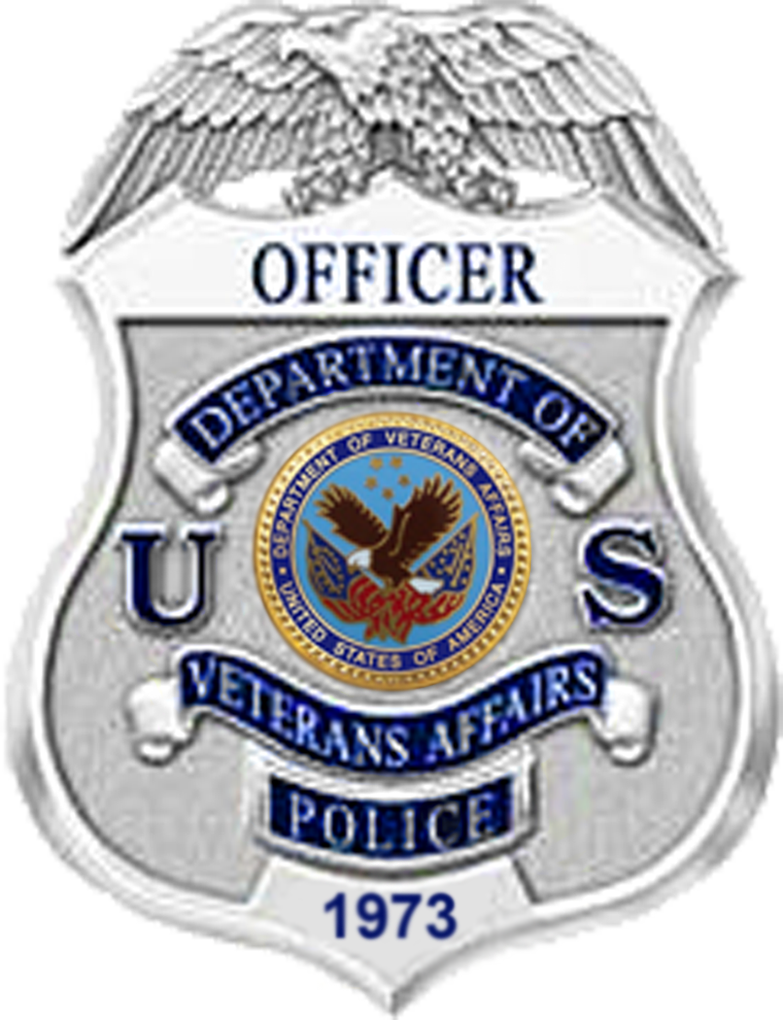
- Badge

- Flag
- Motto: "Protecting those who served"

Agency overview
- Formed: 1973
- Preceding agency: VA Protective Service (1930)
- Employees: 4,000+

Jurisdictional structure
- Federal agency (Operations jurisdiction): United States
- Operations jurisdiction: United States
- Legal jurisdiction: All properties owned, leased or occupied by the Department of Veterans Affairs and not under the control of the General Services Administration
- General nature: Federal law enforcement; Civilian police

Operational structure
- Headquarters: Washington, D.C.
- Agency executive: Frederick Jackson, Director
- Parent agency: United States Department of Veterans Affairs

Website
- osp.va.gov/Police_Services.asp

The United States Department of Veterans Affairs Police (VA Police) is the uniformed law enforcement service of the U.S. Department of Veterans Affairs, responsible for the protection of the VA Medical Centers (VAMC) and other facilities such as Outpatient Clinics (OPC) and Community Based Outpatient Clinics (CBOC) operated by United States Department of Veterans Affairs and its subsidiary components of the Veterans Health Administration (VHA), as well as the National Cemetery Administration (NCA) and the Veterans Benefits Administration (VBA) respectively.

== History ==
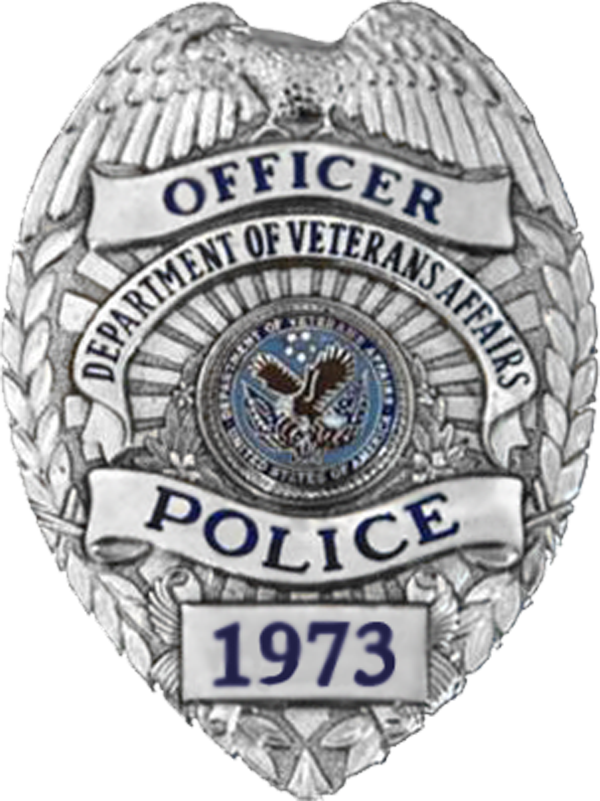
VA Police Badge in use from 1989 to 2013

The roots of today's VA police force began at the National Home for Disabled Volunteer Soldiers (VHA origins) which was authorized as a national soldiers and sailors asylum by President Lincoln on March 3, 1865.

A court martial system was established at the National Homes in September 1867 to consider all cases of offenses made by residents of the Home. Judgment and sentencing were determined by the Governor of each National Home and a Sergeant of Police—a "member" of the Home—was appointed and paid $15 per month. By comparison, the home's chief baker was paid $20 monthly and nurses (male in those days) received $8. A guard house (jail) was located at each National Home branch to protect home "members" from themselves or others.

=== Initial 'Guards' ===
The first official police force was authorized at the National Home in Dayton at the April 11, 1882 Board of Managers meeting in order to preserve "the peace and quiet of the branch." The force consisted of a Captain, one 1st Lieutenant, and one 2nd Lieutenant. They were referred to as "guards" and the force eventually expanded to over 40 guards. The Homes operated under military rules, which often did not suit many of the former farmers and young immigrant residents who lived there. Drunkenness, fighting, violation of passes, profanity, disorderly conduct, and creating a nuisance were the most common offenses. Proceedings of the Home "court" were recorded in Discipline Books.

The most serious offense, in those early days, was bringing liquor onto the Home grounds, followed by going "AWOL" (absent without leave) and "jumping the fence" (defiantly leaving grounds without permission). By the 1880s, all of the National Homes operated beer halls in an effort to control the quality and quantity of alcohol consumed by veterans and to confine the ill effects of drunkenness to the Home grounds. Saloons cropped up in close proximity to all of the National Homes and were a constant temptation for many home residents. At Dayton there were 3,446 discipline charges recorded in 1888 including 1,192 for drunkenness and 1,138 for being AWOL. Members who misbehaved while AWOL were subject to civilian law and often arrested by civilian police and detained in community jails.

Punishment for minor offenses at the National Homes included monetary fines and no passes for 30 days. For more serious crimes, veterans were often assigned to "dump duty." In the 19th century, "dump duty" meant emptying and cleaning cuspidors, bedpans, and picking up trash from the grounds. The most severe penalty inflicted was stone breaking—which was ordered for men who brought whiskey onto the grounds, "jumped the fenced," or willfully disobeyed orders. Stone breaking began at 7 o'clock in the morning. A man was escorted from the guard house to his work pile and back until his sentence was completed. He got one hour and 20 minutes for lunch and his day ended at 5:40. A stone breaking sentence could last for up to six months. Repeat incorrigible offenders were dishonorably discharged from the Home.

The National Homes became part of the Veterans Administration in 1930 and the Home police forces were retained; however, their adjudication system and old guardhouses (jails) soon became obsolete. Having no official police power at that time, guards checked entrants into VA properties, ensured safety of everyone on the grounds, and handed criminal offenders over to state or local police officers for processing in civilian courts or to the Bureau of Investigation (FBI after 1936) for federal crimes. The Veterans Administration police operated in this manner for over 40 years.

=== Late 20th Century ===
After 1970, violent criminal offenses increased on VA grounds and change was imminent for its police force. Guards were elevated to full police status and their training and responsibilities increased. VA police were provided with a weapon: mace.

Afterwards, police batons were added and a VA Police training center was established in North Little Rock, Arkansas, to standardize their training.

During the 1980s, a number of incidents took the lives of four unarmed VA police officers and several other VA personnel, resulting in further changes. Training requirements and program oversight again increased. In 1989, after the Veterans Administration became the Department of Veterans Affairs, the Police and Security Service reorganized as the Office of Security and Law Enforcement (OSCLE). Required training hours for VA police increased from 40 hours in the 1970s to 160 hours by 1992.

=== Arming with firearms ===
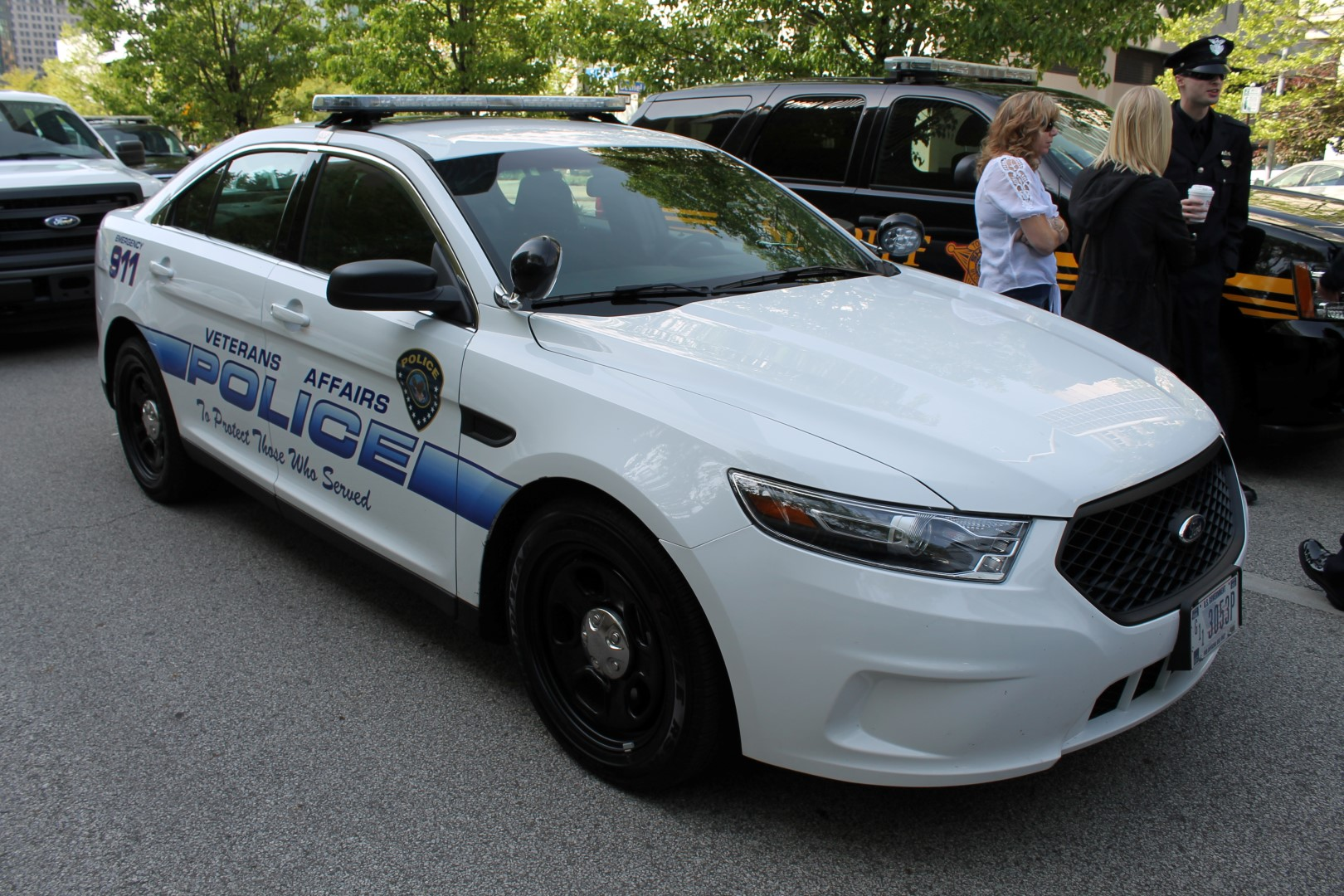
Veterans Affairs Police Ford Taurus Interceptor

In 1992, VA considered arming its police force for the first time. Three years later, Secretary Jesse Brown directed development of a pilot program to arm VA police at no more than six facilities. The following year, a directive and handbook were written.

The Firearm Training Unit of the FBI Academy reviewed VA's firearm training plans and determined that it met or exceeded Federal law enforcement requirements. In September 1996, North Chicago VA Medical Center became the first facility to arm its police officers, followed by Richmond Bronx, West Los Angeles, and Chicago The pilot program proved successful, so around 1998, Secretary Togo West expanded the arming of VA police at a rate of about 16 sites per year.

Following the terrorist attacks of September 11, 2001, the arming program was accelerated. VA contracted with Beretta USA for specially designed pistols and firearms training for its police force. By fall 2002, 92 VA medical centers had 1,830 armed police officers and in 2003 the entire force was armed. In 2002, Jose Rodriguez-Reyes, an officer at the San Juan VAMC in Puerto Rico, was the first police officer to be killed after the VA Police force became armed. Since 1985, at least seven officers have lost their lives while on duty.

=== Current VA Police Weaponry ===
Today, VA Police Officers are issued the SIG Sauer P320, with optic and light as their primary duty weapon. The other approximately 20 percent of VA police carry the Beretta 92D as their primary duty weapon. Plain clothes officers have the option of utilizing the SIG Sauer P320X-Carry with red dot optics.

Additionally, all VA police officers are required to be trained and qualified on the authorized long gun (rifle). The following specifications are required for the long gun: M4 carbine, 11.5 inch short barrel configuration, .223/5.56 mm caliber, with collapsible stock, tactical mounting equipment, and sling. Various tactical optical devices are also allowed.

VA police also carry and are certified in the use of non-lethal weapons: Expandable Straight Baton (ESB) and Oleoresin Capsicum (OC) spray (pepper spray).

== Role ==
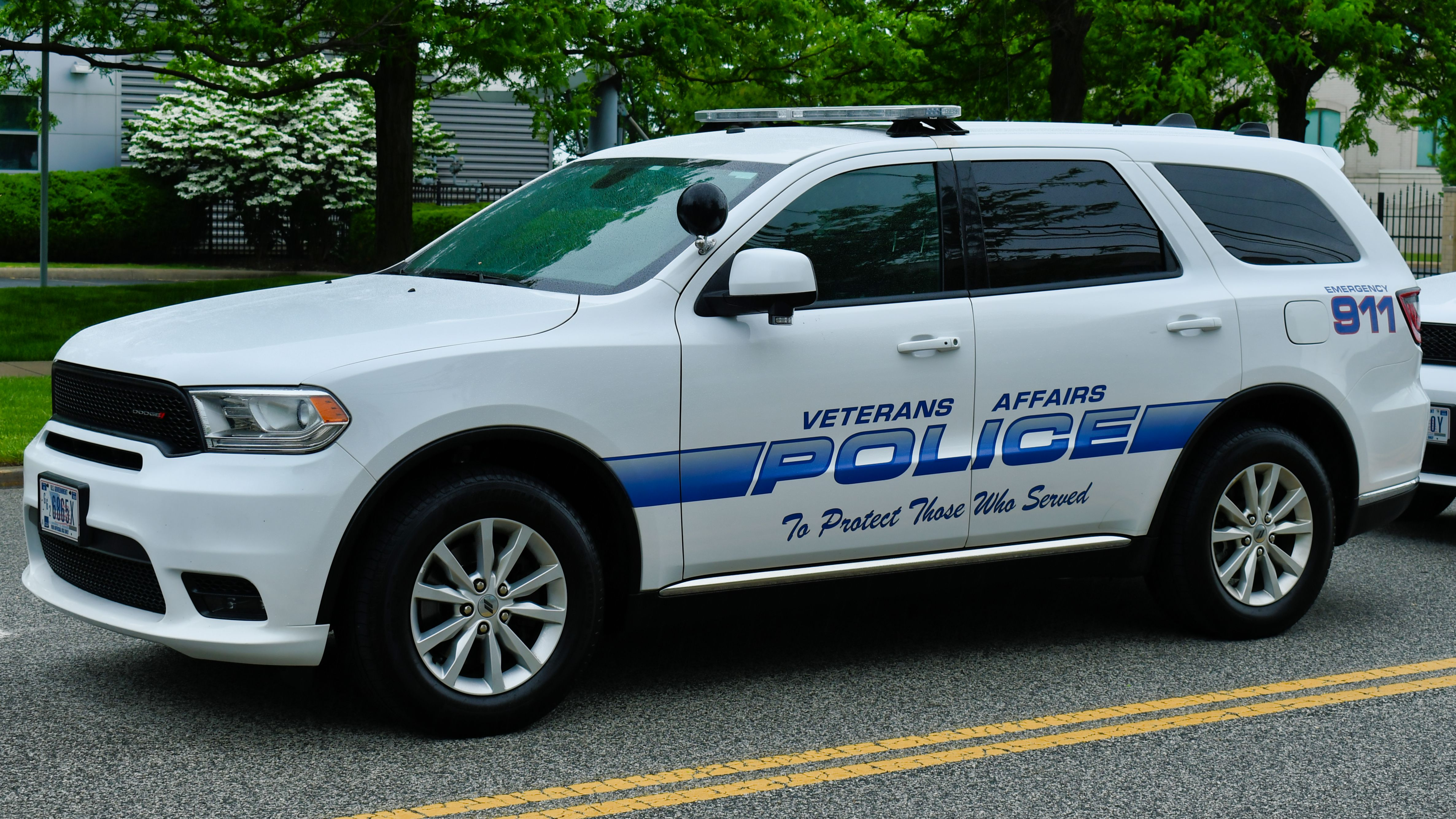
Veterans Affairs Police Dodge Durango

Today's VA police officers face unique challenges compared to the security forces of the past. As vigilant, armed, professional federal law enforcement officers who undergo extensive specialized academy training, they possess full authority to enforce federal laws and VA regulations on department property. They are trained to prevent crime, defuse threats, and take swift action when necessary.

Their skills include accident investigation, surveillance, fraud detection, preventing or defusing violence in the workplace, fingerprinting, detective and crime scene investigation, and much more. Many of them have college degrees and backgrounds as military or civilian police officers.

All must meet the standards set by the U.S. Office of Personnel Management for federal police officers and investigators and must pass background, physical, and mental examinations. Not only are they on the alert for domestic or workplace violations, they watch for terrorist activity, as well.

VA police officers work with the Federal Bureau of Investigation (FBI) to ensure enforcement of all federal laws and the safety of veterans, employees, contractors, visitors, and the public. Many of VA's Police force work behind the scenes as trainers, investigators, analysts, policymakers, developers of standards and practices, and more, to protect VA employees, veterans, property, and the public.

The VA Law Enforcement Training Center in North Little Rock, Arkansas now provides professional police training to other federal agencies, not just to VA's own police force.

The VA Police have several divisions and operate separately but alongside the VA Law Enforcement Training Center (VA LETC) under the umbrella of the Office of Security and Law Enforcement.

The primary role of VA Police is to serve as a protective uniformed police force in order to deter and prevent crime, maintain order, and investigate crimes (ranging from summary to felony offenses) which may have occurred within the jurisdiction of the Department or its federal assets.

Some cases are investigated in conjunction with Special Agents from the Office of the Inspector General (VA OIG).

== Powers and authority ==
VA Police derive their authority by virtue of 38 United States Code Sections 901 & 902. Rules, regulations, and enforcement actions specific to the Department of Veterans Affairs are established by virtue of 38 Code of Federal Regulations 1.218.

Legislation to expand the powers and authority of the Veterans Affairs Police was eventually rolled into the S.1963 - Caregivers and Veterans Omnibus Health Services Act of 2010 Bill (proposed law) and was re-introduced in the 111th Congress on Oct 28, 2009. The Bill passed the United States Senate on Nov 19, 2009, passed the United States House of Representatives on Apr 21, 2010, and was signed into law by President Barack Obama on May 5, 2010 becoming Public Law No: 111-163.

The Government Publishing Office (GPO) has officially published this law in its roles, noting that the law (and therefore the increased uniform allowance and expanded authority of the VA Police to include the ability to conduct investigations, on and off Department property, took legal effect on January 7, 2011.

== Oversight ==
The Office of Security and Law Enforcement (OS&LE) is the parent agency of the VA Police within the Law Enforcement Oversight & Criminal Investigation Division (LEO/CID) which provides national oversight to individual VA Police Services at each location throughout the United States. They also facilitate support, guidance, funds and regulation of the Police Service and their corresponding independent facilities.

== Structure ==
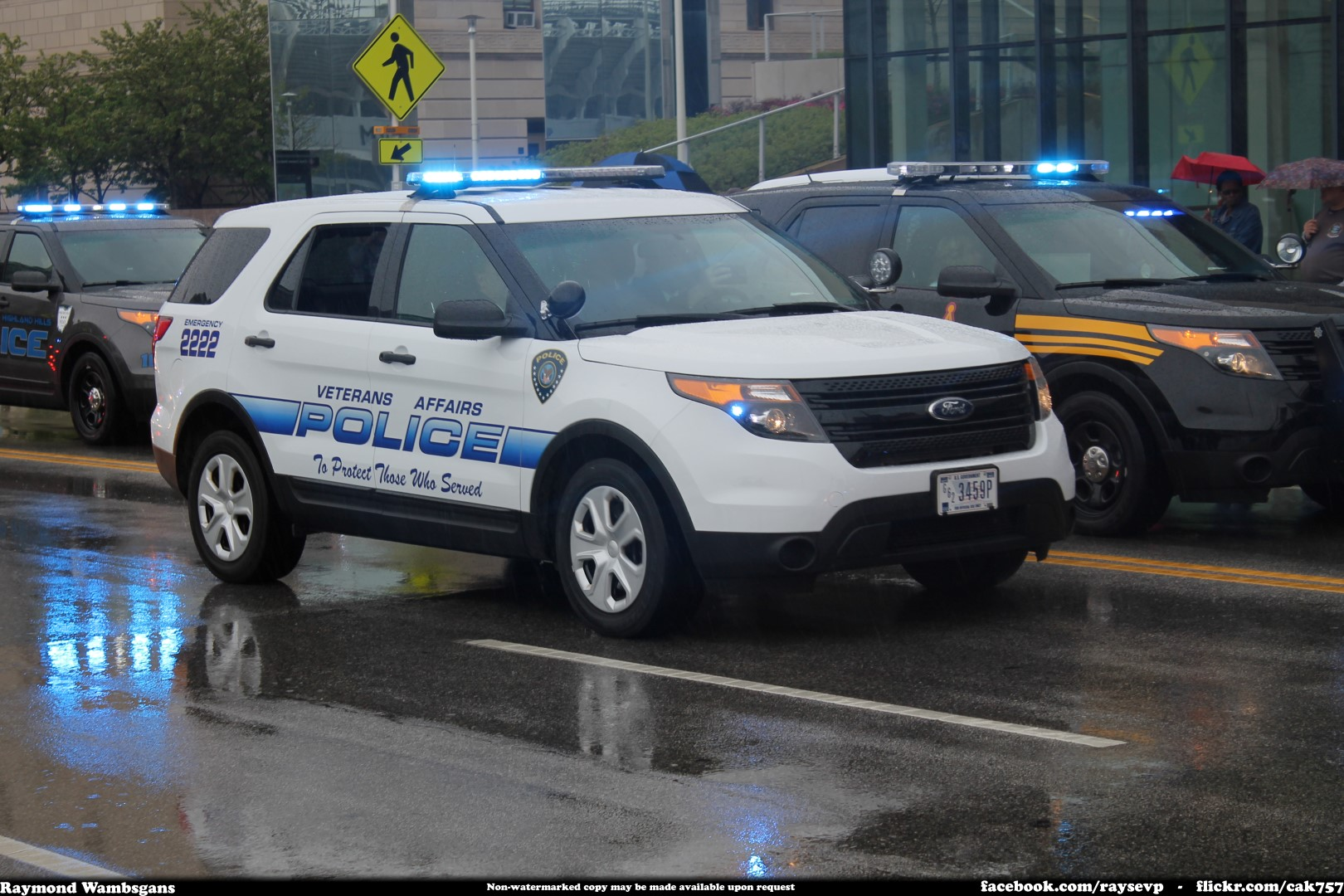
Veterans Affairs Police Ford Explorer

Upper level management and specialty positions other than Police Officer include (in no particular order); Detective (1811 Series Criminal Investigator). Other semi standardized rank structures are developed within each VA Police Service at the local level. These serve to reflect job title, function, and/or role and range from Sergeant to Chief. The VA Police also maintain groups of specialty service elements such as K-9, bicycle, boat and motorcycle patrols.

The Veterans Affairs Police Officers do not receive FERS Federal Law Enforcement/Firefighter Special Retirement benefits unlike their VA Fire Service counterparts.

The VA Police are an armed, federal law enforcement and protective service entity that operates in and around the various Veterans Affairs Medical Centers, National Cemeteries and other VA facilities located throughout the whole of United States to include Puerto Rico and the United States Virgin Islands. Among others, the VA Police are a specialized federal law enforcement agency, whose officers have full police powers derived from statutory authority to enforce all federal laws, VA rules and regulations, and to make arrests on VA controlled property whether owned or leased.

== Line-of-duty deaths ==
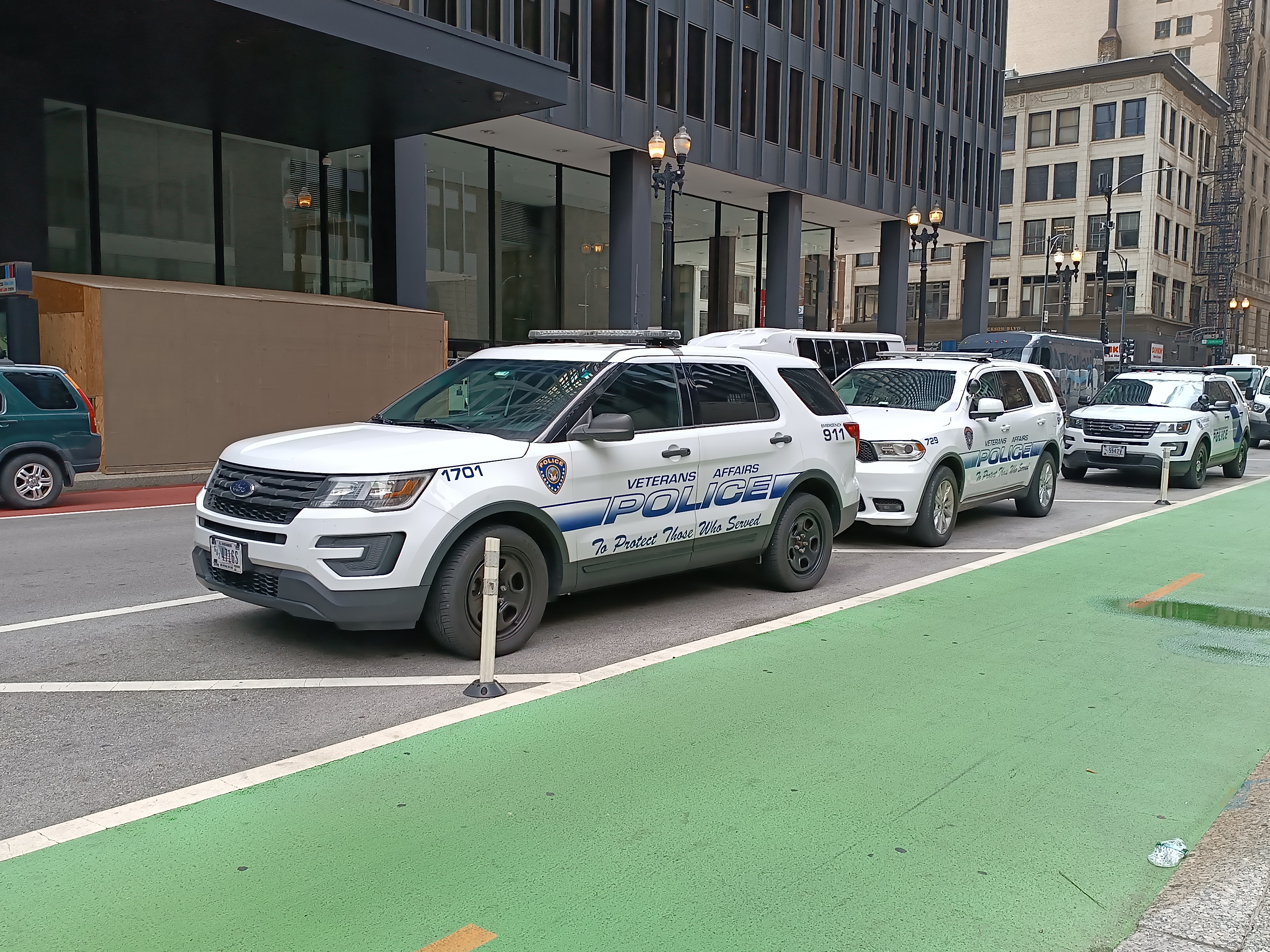
Veterans Affairs police cars in Chicago

Ten officers of the VA Police died in the line of duty:

- Marvin C. Bland, age 34, was killed in an automobile accident on September 6, 1985, while responding to a fire alarm at the Veterans Affairs Hospital in Bedford, Massachusetts.
- Mark S. Decker, age 31, and Leonard B. Wilcox, age 37, were shot and killed on January 31, 1986, while attempting to question a suspicious man at the Brecksville VA Hospital in Brecksville, Ohio. Both Decker and Wilcox were armed only with mace due to administrative guidelines. While the officers were talking with the man he pulled out a .45 caliber handgun and shot Officer Decker, killing him instantly. Officer Wilcox attempted to run for cover, but the suspect chased him before shooting him as well. The killer was sentenced to two life terms for the murders.
- Ronald Hearn, age 49, was shot and killed on July 25, 1988 at the Bronx VA Hospital in New York City. The alarm was set off when a man walked through the metal detector; when Hearn approached the man, he pulled out a gun and shot Hearn, who was wearing a vest but was shot between the two panels. At the time of Hearn's death VA Police were not supplied vests or firearms.
- Garry A. Ross, age 41, died from a heart attack on December 24, 1990 at the VA Medical Center in Washington, D.C. Ross died after responding to a call of a mentally deranged patient, who assaulted him several times. Ross suffered a massive heart attack after he restrained the patient.
- Horst Harold Woods, age 46, was shot and killed on January 10, 1996, in Albuquerque, New Mexico. Woods had approached a man kneeling beside his patrol car; when Woods approached him from the opposite side of the car, the man stood up, exchanged words with Woods, and then shot him in the back of his head as Woods turned away. The man was arrested later the same day. The suspect was arrested a short time later by Air Force Security Police Law Enforcement Officers, now called Security Forces from Kirtland Air Force Base, where he was found with "two extra fully loaded magazines, an 18-inch bowie knife and a long-barreled Derringer loaded with two shotgun shells."
- Jose Oscar Rodriguez-Reyes, age 53, was shot and killed on April 24, 2002 while stationed at a gate at the VA Medical Center in San Juan, Puerto Rico. Rodriguez-Reyes was attacked by two men for unknown reasons and shot in the head and chest. The two attempted to steal Rodriguez-Reyes' service weapon but were unable to remove it from the holster. Rodriguez-Reyes was the first armed VA Police officer to be killed in the line of duty. Two suspects were arrested by the FBI. Charged with murder, the suspect who shot Rodriguez-Reyes was convicted in July 2006.
- Police Officer Ronald Leisure, age 66, suffered a fatal heart attack while conducting a foot patrol of the VA Medical Center in Livermore, California, on 14 November 2014. He was conducting checks of the large complex when he suddenly collapsed. Medical staff immediately initiated lifesaving measures but were unable to resuscitate him.
- Special Agent Gregory Cleveland Holland, aged 47, died from complications as the result of contracting COVID-19 as the result of a presumed exposure while on duty at the VA Law Enforcement Training Center in North Little Rock, Arkansas on Friday, August 13, 2021.
- Corporal Raymond Kuuchi, aged 44, died of a heart attack while participating in training at the VA Law Enforcement Training Center on September 2, 2024.

== See also ==
- Federal law enforcement in the United States
