= Larry J. Siever =

American psychiatrist (1947–2021)

Larry Joseph Siever was an American psychiatrist who was a leading figure in the study of personality disorders.

== Early life ==
Larry Siever was born in 1947 in Urbana, Illinois. His father, Raymond Siever was a geologist, and his mother Doris Fisher was a schoolteacher. As a child he moved to Belmont, Massachusetts. In 1965 he was named a Presidential Scholar by the Department of Education for his academic success at Belmont High School.

== Career ==
Siever worked at the Mount Sinai Hospital and James J. Peters VA Medical Center. Prior to Mount Sinai and the VA, Siever worked for the National Institutes of Health and for McLean Hospital. Siever was the director Mood and Personality Disorders Program at Mount Sinai and the director of the Mental Illness Research, Education and Clinical Centers at the James J Peters VA Medical Center. He was president of the Society of Biological Psychiatry and a fellow of the American College of Neuropsychopharmacology. Siever also founded the Veterans Integrated Service Networks. He died in 2021 due to illness.

He graduated from Harvard College and Stanford University School of Medicine.

== Research ==
Siever's research led to the removal of the distinction between Axis I and Axis II personality disorders. Siever primarily studied the neuroscientific causes of Schizotypal (StPD) and Borderline personality disorder (BPD). To do this, he researched dopamine's relationship with StPD and used Positron Emission Tomography to understand the chemical causes of BPD. Alongside personality disorders, he was also knowledgeable in the fields of personality, schizophrenia, mood, impulse-control disorders. Siever published more than 400 peer reviewed papers on personality disorders.

== Honors ==
Because of his efforts, in 2011 he was awarded the Senior Career Award in recognition of his "distinguished and pioneering contributions to the study of personality disorders” by the International Society for the Study of Personality Disorders. Siever's research also lead to the American Psychiatric Association awarding him the Judd Marmor award in 2011.
