= James Cimino =

James E. Cimino
- Born: 1928
- Died: February 11, 2010 (aged 81–82)
- Education: New York University School of Medicine
- Occupation: physician
- Known for: Cimino fistula, palliative care
- Medical career
- Institutions: Bronx Veterans Administration Medical Center, Calvary Hospital
- Research: Hemodialysis, Nephrology

James E. Cimino (1928-11 February 2010) was a physician who specialized in palliative care. He is best known for his invention of the Cimino fistula and for his work as an administrator at Calvary Hospital into the Palliative Care Center it is today.

Dr. Cimino went to New York University School of Medicine and did his internal medicine residency at the University of Buffalo followed by a fellowship in physiology. He then moved back to the Bronx to work at the Bronx Veterans Administration Medical Center where he started a program on dialysis. He developed techniques for employing arteriovenous fistula in patients with chronic kidney failure, which led to a presentation in 1966 at the convention of the American Society for Artificial Internal Organs. His presentation at first was met with indifference, but eventually was established as an important contribution to the field.
