= Stephen Waxman =

American neurologist and neuroscientist

Stephen G. Waxman
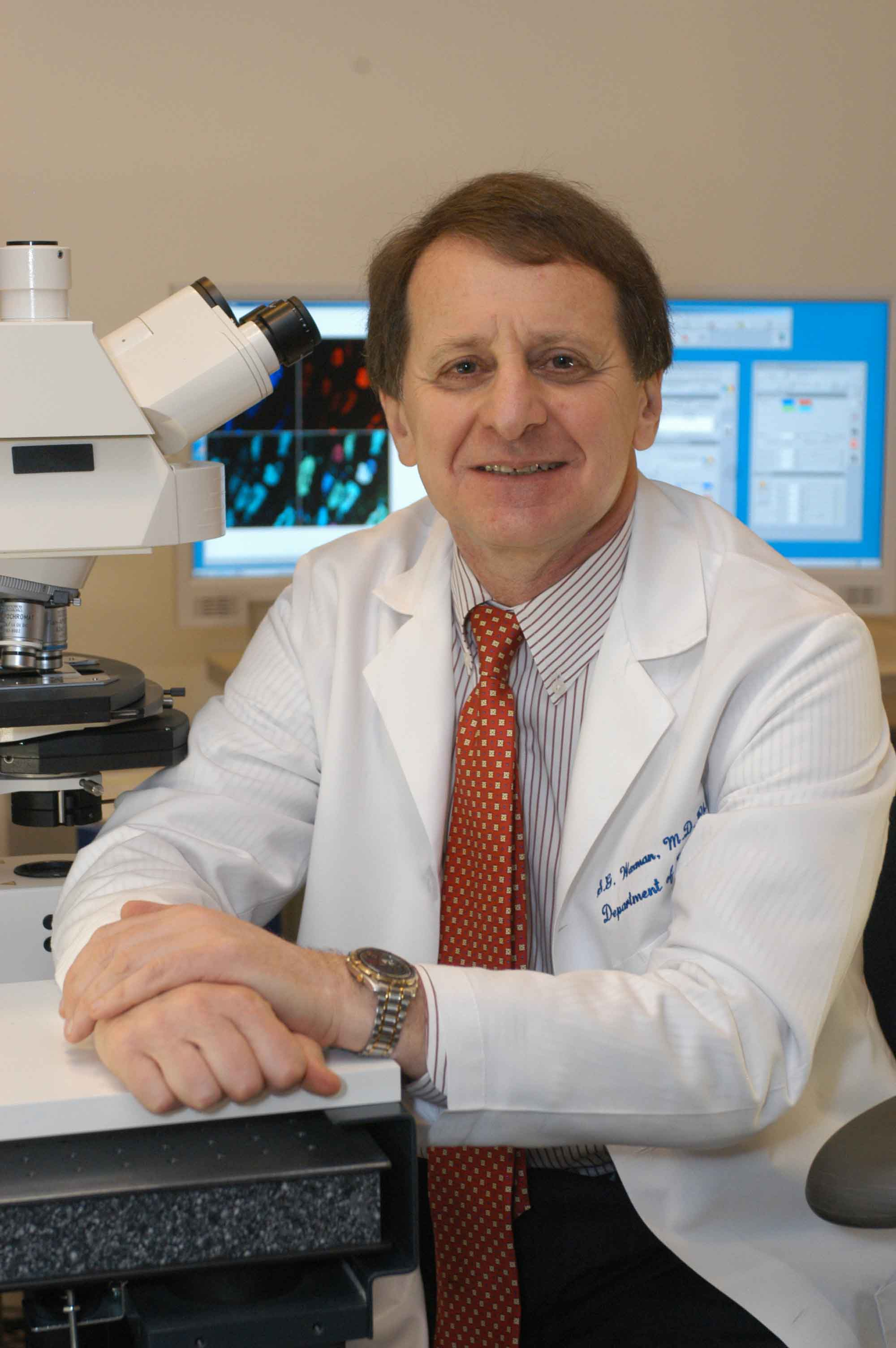
- Waxman in his laboratory in 2002
- Born: 1945 (age 80–81)
- Education: Harvard University (BA); Albert Einstein College of Medicine (PhD, MD); Massachusetts Institute of Technology (Postdoctoral Fellow); Harvard Medical School (Clinical Fellow)
- Scientific career
- Fields: Neurology; Neuroscience; Neurobiology; Pharmacology
- Workplaces: Yale University (1986-); University College London (1998-); Stanford University (1978-1986); Harvard University (1975-1978); MIT (1975-1978)

Stephen George Waxman (born 1945) is an American neurologist and neuroscientist. He served as Chairman of the Department of Neurology at Yale School of Medicine, and Neurologist-in-Chief at Yale-New Haven Hospital from 1986 until 2009. As of 2023, he is the Bridget Flaherty Professor of Neurology, Neurobiology, and Pharmacology at Yale University. He founded the Yale University Neuroscience & Regeneration Research Center in 1988 and is its director. He previously held faculty positions at Harvard Medical School, MIT, and Stanford Medical School. He is also visiting professor at University College London. He is the editor-in-chief of The Neuroscientist.

== Early life and education ==
Stephen Waxman was born on August 17, 1945, and grew up in Newark, New Jersey. His father was a court reporter and his mother a housewife. Waxman received his BA from Harvard University (1967), and his PhD (1970) and MD (1972) degrees from Albert Einstein College of Medicine. After finishing medical and graduate school, Waxman trained as a Postdoctoral Fellow at MIT, a Clinical Fellow at Harvard Medical School, and a Resident at Boston City Hospital until 1975. He then served on the faculty at Harvard Medical School and MIT prior to being recruited in 1978, at age 33, as Professor of Neurology at Stanford University Medical School and Chief of Neurology at the Palo Alto Veterans Administration Hospital.

== Research ==
Stephen Waxman became interested in nerve fibers, and how they carry messages from one nerve cell to the next in the form of nerve impulses, as a student doing research at Harvard and University College London in the 1960s. At that time, it was widely assumed that nerve fibers had evolved so as to transmit nerve impulses from one end to the other as rapidly as possible. Waxman showed that in some parts of the nervous system, nerve fibers function differently and act as “delay lines”, carrying information at less-than-maximal velocity. This occurs, for example, in motor systems where timing is critical and the moment of arrival of each nerve impulse must be finely tuned to within thousandths of a second. This early work, and related studies in which Waxman demonstrated that nerve fibers can act as filters, transforming and processing some messages rather than merely transmitting them, established Waxman as a leading figure in neuroscience research. One of Waxman's first papers appeared in Nature while he was still a medical student.

Following medical school, a Ph.D. degree, internship and residency in neurology, Waxman turned his focus to nerve injury and to multiple sclerosis and spinal cord injury, the most common neurologic cripplers of young adults. Waxman became interested in how remissions – recovery of previously lost functions such as vision or the ability to walk – occur in patients with MS. It had been appreciated for nearly a century that in MS, there is damage to the myelin sheath, which wraps around axons and insulates them, and it was assumed that the loss of myelin insulation was the cause of impaired nerve impulse conduction in MS. Waxman showed, however, that the story is much more complicated. In this work, carried out in the mid-1970s, he focused on sodium channels, a family of specialized protein molecules that he likened to “molecular batteries” which produce nerve impulses, and he showed that they were not sprinkled uniformly along the entire length of nerve fibers but, rather, are concentrated at small gaps in the myelin. This implied that parts of the axon lacking sodium channels are uncovered following damage to the myelin, helping to explain why nerve fibers in MS are unable to generate nerve impulses. He then showed that demyelinated nerve fibers recover the capability to transmit nerve impulses by a remarkable “molecular remodeling” in which they acquire additional sodium channels in regions where myelin has been lost. For this work Dr. Waxman was awarded the Dystel Prize, given jointly by the American Academy of Neurology and the National Multiple Sclerosis Society.

Building on his interest in nerve injury and his expertise on sodium channels, Waxman made a series of important discoveries about pain after injury to the nervous system. He was the first to show that after nerve injury, the damaged nerve cells send erroneous pain signals to the brain because they turn on the genes for the wrong types of sodium channels, a phenomenon that Waxman likened to “putting type D batteries into a portable radio that needs AA batteries”. These studies provided a major clue to understanding neuropathic pain.

Waxman's next major studies – carried out at a time when the opiate epidemic was causing deaths around the country – helped to propel the search for new, non-addictive pain medications. Every person who has gone to the dentist knows that, after local injection of a medication like novocain, there is no pain. Novocain, and drugs like it, act by blocking the activity of sodium channels, thus preventing nerve fibers from firing. However, these drugs can not be given systemically via a pill that is swallowed to treat pain, because when the drug reaches the heart and brain, sodium channels in those organs are blocked, so that there is double-vision, impaired balance, sleepiness or confusion. This was a time of rapid new discovery that Waxman called the “molecular revolution”. Discovery that there were multiple types of sodium channels encoded by different genes, each with slightly different properties and a different distribution in the body, triggered the critical question “might there be ‘peripheral sodium channels’, essential for pain-signaling in peripheral nerve cells but not in brain and heart?” and the suggestion that, if these channels existed, it might be possible to selectively block them to alleviate pain without side effects on the heart or brain. Waxman's work contributed to demonstration that three peripheral sodium channels – Nav1.7, Nav1.8, and Nav1.9 – played major roles in pain signaling by peripheral neurons, and demonstrated that all three are major players in pain.

As part of his push to understand these peripheral channels and the genes encoding them – which he came to call “pain genes” – Waxman pursued the goal of “genetic validation”. Here, he reasoned that hereditary pain syndromes, while very rare, could point to key pain-related genes and teach important lessons about the molecular basis for pain. This was the strategy that had enabled the development of statin medications a decade before, when very rare families with inherited hypercholesterolemia pointed the way toward the roles of lipids in heart disease. In 2004-5, in a keystone leap from laboratory to humans, Waxman combined molecular genetics, molecular biology, and biophysics to demonstrate that the Nav1.7 channel is a master regulator of human pain. In these studies Waxman showed that inherited erythromelalgia, also known as the “man on fire syndrome”, is caused by mutations which cause the Nav1.7 sodium channel to turn on inappropriately, thereby producing pain signals that are transmitted to the brain even in the absence of a painful stimulus. This discovery was followed by the demonstration, again by Waxman and his team, that abnormal accumulations of Nav1.7 and Nav1.8 which function in tandem to produce nerve impulses, lead to inappropriate firing of damaged nerves that causes pain in humans after nerve injury and traumatic limb amputation. In collaboration with colleagues at University of Maastricht, Waxman then showed that mutations of Nav1.7 and Nav1.8 can cause relatively common painful peripheral neuropathies. These studies were among the first to show the contribution of sodium channels to human pain.

Waxman was particularly proud of a study in which he used atomic-level modeling to advance pharmacogenomics in a paper that was accompanied by an editorial stating “there are still relatively few examples in medicine where molecular reasoning has been rewarded with a comparable degree of success”. He used computer modeling to assess the ways that different ion channels collaborate like members of a symphony to modulate the messaging of pain-signaling neurons. Waxman also studied why some individuals seem to tolerate pain better than others. Using human stem cells to model painful disease, Waxman pinpointed several “pain resilience” genes. Waxman's studies propelled a generation of clinical studies on a new class of medications aimed at relieving pain by blocking Nav1.7 and Nav1.8.

== Awards and distinctions ==
Waxman has been the recipient of many distinctions:

- 1973 - Trygve Tuve Memorial Award for Outstanding Contributions in the Biomedical Sciences, NIH
- 1975 - Research Career Development Award, NINCDS
- 1987 - Established Investigator, National Multiple Sclerosis Society
- 1991 - Distinguished Alumnus Award, Albert Einstein College of Medicine
- 1991 - Fellow, Royal Society of Medicine
- 1993 - Member, Dana Alliance for Brain Initiatives
- 1994 - Listed in The Best Doctors in America.
- 1995 - The Adrian Lecture (Xth International Congress of Clinical Neurophysiology)
- 1996 - Elected to Institute of Medicine, National Academy of Sciences
- 1999 - Landmark Award for Biomedical Research
- 1999 - Wartenberg Award, American Academy of Neurology
- 1999 - Honorary Senior Fellow, Institute of Neurology, London
- 2000 - Dystel Prize for Research on Multiple Sclerosis, American Academy of Neurology/NMSS
- 2004 - Reingold Award, National Multiple Sclerosis Society
- 2005 - Honorary Member, Association of British Neurologists
- 2009 - W.I. McDonald Award, British Multiple Sclerosis Society
- 2009 - William S Middleton Award (highest scientific honor of the Department of Veterans Affairs, presented at Ceremonies at the U.S. Capitol).
- 2009 - Annual Review Prize, The Physiological Society (Premier Award of the Society; previous awardees include A.F. Huxley, A.L. Hodgkin)
- 2013 - Paul B. Magnuson Award for Outstanding Achievement in Rehabilitation Research, U.S. Department of Veterans Affairs
- 2013 - American Neurological Assoc/Annals of Neurology Prize for Distinguished Contribution to Clinical Neuroscience
- 2014 - Soriano Award, American Neurological Association
- 2018 - Julius Axelrod Prize, Society for Neuroscience

=== Selected publications ===
Kriebel, M. E., Bennett, M. V. L., Waxman, S. G. and Pappas, G. D. Oculomotor neurons in fish: electrotonic coupling and multiple sites of impulse initiation. Science, 166:520-524, 1969. doi:10.1126/science.166.3904.520 PMID 4309628

Waxman, S. G. Closely spaced nodes of Ranvier in the teleost brain. Nature, 227:283-284, 1970. doi:10.1038/227283a0 PMID 5428197

Waxman, S. G. and Bennett, M. V. L. Relative conduction velocities of small myelinated and non- myelinated fibers in the central nervous system. Nature New Biology, 238:217-219, 1972. doi:10.1038/newbio238217a0 PMID: 4506206

Waxman, S. G. and Geschwind, N. Hypergraphia in temporal lobe epilepsy. Neurology, 14:629- 637, 1974. (reprinted in: Epilepsy and Behav, 6:282-91, 2005). doi:10.1016/j.yebeh.2004.11.022 PMID 15710320

Swadlow, H. A. and Waxman, S. G. Observations on impulse conduction along central axons. Proceedings of the National Academy of Sciences – U.S.A., 72:5156-5159, 1975. doi:10.1073/pnas.72.12.5156 PMID: 1061101

Waxman, S. G. Prerequisites for conduction in demyelinated fibers. Neurology, 28:27-34, 1978. doi:10.1212/wnl.28.9_part_2.27 PMID 568749

Swadlow, H. A., Geschwind, N. and Waxman, S. G. Commissural transmission in humans. Science, 204:530-531, 1979. doi:10.1126/science.432661 PMID 432661

Foster, R. E., Whalen, C. C. and Waxman, S. G. Reorganization of the axonal membrane of demyelinated nerve fibers: morphological evidence. Science, 210:661-663, 1980. doi:10.1126/science.6159685 PMID: 6159685

Kocsis, J. D. and Waxman, S. G. Absence of potassium conductance in central myelinated axons. Nature, 287:348-349, 1980. doi:10.1038/287348a0 PMID 7421994

Malenka, R. C., Kocsis, J. D., Ransom, B. R. and Waxman, S. G. Modulation of parallel fiber excitability by postsynaptically mediated changes in extracellular potassium. Science, 214:339-341, 1981. doi:10.1126/science.7280695 PMID: 7280695

Waxman, S. G. Current concepts in neurology: membranes, myelin and the pathophysiology of multiple sclerosis. New England Journal of Medicine, 306:1529-1533, 1982. doi:10.1056/NEJM198206243062505 PMID: 7043271

Kocsis, J. D. and Waxman, S. G. Long-term regenerated nerve fibres retain sensitivity to potassium channel blocking agents. Nature, 304:640-642, 1983. doi:10.1038/304640a0 PMID 6308475

Waxman, S. G. and Ritchie, J. M. Organization of ion channels in the myelinated nerve fiber. Science, 228:1502-1507, 1985. doi:10.1126/science.2409596 PMID: 2409596

Stys, P. K., Ransom, B. R., Waxman, S. G. and Davis, P. K. Role of extracellular calcium in anoxic injury of mammalian central white matter. Proceedings of the National Academy of Sciences – U.S.A., 87:4212-4216, 1990. doi:10.1073/pnas.87.11.4212 PMID: 2349231

Stys, P.K., Waxman, S.G. and Ransom, B.R. Ionic mechanisms of anoxic injury in mammalian CNS white matter: Role of Na+ channels and Na+-Ca2+ exchanger. Journal of Neuroscience, 12:430-439, 1992. doi:10.1523/JNEUROSCI.12-02-00430.1992 PMID: 1311030

Stys, P.K., Sontheimer, H., Ransom, B.R. and Waxman, S.G. Non-inactivating, TTX-sensitive Na+ conductance in rat optic nerve axons. Proceedings of the National Academy of Sciences – U.S.A., 90:6976-6980, 1993. doi:10.1073/pnas.90.15.6976 PMID: 8394004

Waxman, S.G., Kocsis, J.D. and Black, J.A. Type III sodium channel mRNA is expressed in embryonic but not adult spinal sensory neurons, and is re-expressed following axotomy. Journal of Neurophysiology, 72:466-471,1994. doi:10.1152/jn.1994.72.1.466 PMID: 7965028

Utzschneider, D.A., Archer, D.R., Kocsis, J.D., Waxman, S.G. and Duncan, I.D. Transplantation of glial cells enhances action potential conduction of amyelinated spinal cord axons in the myelin-deficient rat. Proceedings of the National Academy of Sciences – U.S.A., 91:53-57, 1994. doi:10.1073/pnas.91.1.53 PMID: 8278406

Waxman, S.G. Demyelinating diseases: New pathological insights, new therapeutic targets. New England Journal of Medicine, 338:323-325, 1998. doi:10.1073/pnas.91.1.53 PMID: 9445415

Dib-Hajj, S.D., Tyrrell, L., Black, J.A., Waxman, S.G. NaN, a novel voltage-gated Na channel preferentially expressed in peripheral sensory neurons and down-regulated following axotomy. Proceedings of the National Academy of Sciences – U.S.A., 95:8963-8968, 1998. doi:10.1073/pnas.95.15.8963 PMID: 9671787

Tanaka, M., Cummins, T.R., Ishikawa, K., Black, J.A., Ibata, Y., Waxman, S.G. Molecular and functional remodeling of electrogenic membrane of hypothalamic neurons in response to changes in their input. Proceedings of the National Academy of Sciences – U.S.A., 96:1088-1093, 1999. doi:10.1073/pnas.96.3.1088 PMID: 9927698

Black, J. A., Dib-Hajj, S., Baker, D., Newcombe, J., Cuzner, M. L., Waxman, S. G. Sensory neuron specific sodium channel SNS is abnormally expressed in the brains of mice with experimental allergic encephalomyelitis and humans with multiple sclerosis. Proceedings of the National Academy of Sciences – U.S.A., 97: 11598-11602, 2000. doi:10.1073/pnas.97.21.11598 PMID: 11027357

Waxman, S. G. Transcriptional channelopathies: an emerging class of disorders. Nature Reviews – Neuroscience, 2: 652-659, 2001. doi:10.1038/35090026 PMID: 11533733

Craner, M.J., Newcombe, J., Black, J.A., Hartle, C., Cuzner, M.L., Waxman, S.G. Molecular changes in neurons in MS: altered axonal expression of Na_{v}1.2 and Na_{v}1.6 sodium channels and Na^{+} /Ca^{2+} exchanger. Proceedings of the National Academy of Sciences – U.S.A., 101: 8168-8173, 2004. doi:10.1073/pnas.0402765101 PMID: 15148385

Dib-Hajj, S.D., Rush, A.M., Cummins, T.R., Hisama, F.M., Novella, S., Tyrrell, L., Marshall, L., Waxman, S.G. Gain-of-function mutation in Nav1.7 in familial erythromelalgia induces bursting of sensory neurons. Brain, 128:1847-1854, 2005. doi:10.1093/brain/awh514 PMID: 15958509

Waxman, S.G., Dib-Hajj, S.D. Erythermalgia: molecular basis for an inherited pain syndrome. Trends in Molecular Medicine, 11 (12): 555-562, 2005. doi:10.1016/j.molmed.2005.10.004 PMID: 16278094

Waxman, S.G. Axonal conduction and injury in multiple sclerosis: the role of sodium channels. Nature Reviews – Neuroscience, 5: 932-942 (2006). doi:10.1038/nrn2023 PMID: 17115075

Waxman, S.G. A channel sets the gain on pain. Nature, 444: 831-832, 2006. doi:10.1038/444831a PMID 17167466

Rush, A.M., Dib-Hajj, S.D., Liu, S., Cummins, T.R, Black, J.A., Waxman, S.G. A single sodium channel mutation produces hyper-or hypoexcitability in different types of neurons. Proceedings of the National Academy of Sciences – U.S.A., 103: 8245-8250, 2006. doi:10.1073/pnas.0602813103 PMID: 16702558

Waxman, S.G. Channel, neuronal, and clinical function in sodium channelopathies: From genotype to phenotype. Nature Neuroscience, 10:405-410, 2007. doi:10.1038/nn1857 PMID 17387329

Waxman, S.G. Sodium channels and neuroprotection in MS: current status. Nature Clinical Neurology, 4:159-170, 2008. doi:10.1038/ncpneuro0735 PMID: 18227822

Faber, C.G., Hoeijmakers, J.G.J., Ahn, H.S., Cheng, X, Han, C., Choi, J.S., Estacion, M., Lauria, G., Vanhoutte, E.K., Gerrits, M.M., Dib-Hajj, S., Drenth, J.P.H., Waxman, S.G., and Merkies, I.S.J. Gain-of-function Na_{V}1.7 mutations in idiopathic small fiber neuropathy. Annals of Neurology, 71(1):26-39, 2012. doi:10.1002/ana.22485 PMID 21698661

Dib-Hajj, S.D., Yang, Y., Black, J.A., Waxman, S.G. The Na_{V}1.7 sodium channel: from molecule to man. Nature Reviews Neuroscience, 14(1): 49-62, 2013. doi:10.1038/nrn3404 PMID 23232607

Samad, O.A., Tan, A. M., Cheng, X., Foster, E., Dib-Hajj, S.D., Waxman, S.G. Virus-mediated shRNA knockdown of Na_{V}1.3 in rat dorsal root ganglion attenuates nerve-injury induced neuropathic pain. Molecular Therapy, 21(1): 49-56, 2013. doi:10.1038/mt.2012.169 PMID: 22910296

Faber, C.G., Lauria, G., Merkies, I.S.J., Cheng, X., Han, C., Ahn, H-S., Persson, A-K., Hoeijmakers, J.G.J., Gerrits, M.M., Pierro, T., Lombardi, R., Kapetis, D., Dib-Hajj, S.D., and Waxman, S.G. Gain-of-function Na_{V}1.8 mutations in painful neuropathy. Proceedings of the National Academy of Sciences – U.S.A., 109:19444-19449, 2012. doi:10.1073/pnas.1216080109 PMID: 23115331

Yang, Y., Dib-Hajj, S.D., Zhang, J., Zhang, Y., Tyrrell, L., Estacion, M., and Waxman, S.G. Structural modeling and mutant cycle analysis predict pharmacoresponsiveness of a NaV1.7 mutant channel. Nature Communications, 3: 1186, 2012. doi:10.1038/ncomms2184 PMID 23149731

Veeramah, K.R., O’Brien, J.E., Meisler, M.H., Cheng, X., Dib-Hajj, S.D., Waxman, S.G., Talwar, D., Girirajan, S., Eichler, E.E., Restifo, L.L., Erickson, R.P., Hammer, M.F. De novo pathogenic mutation of SCN8A identified by whole genome sequencing of a family quartet with infantile epileptic encephalopathy and SUDEP. American Journal of Human Genetics, 90(3): 502-510, 2012. doi:10.1016/j.ajhg.2012.01.006 PMID 22365152

Shields, S.D., Butt, R.P., Dib-Hajj, S.D., and Waxman, S.G. Oral administration of PF-01247324, a subtype-selective Nav1.8 blocker, reverses cerebellar deficits in a mouse model of multiple sclerosis. PLoS One, 10(3): e0119067. 2015. doi:10.1371/journal.pone.0119067 PMID 25747279

Dib-Hajj, S.D., Black, J.A., and Waxman, S.G. Na_{V}1.9: A sodium channel linked to human pain. Nature Reviews – Neuroscience, 16: 511-19, 2015. doi:10.1038/nrn3977 PMID 26243570

Geha, P., Yang, Y., Estacion, M., Schulman, B.R., Tokuno, H., Apkarian, A.V., Dib-Hajj, S.D., Waxman, S.G. Pharmacotherapy for pain in a family with inherited erythromelalgia guided by genomic analysis and functional profiling. JAMA Neurology, 73(6):659-67, 2016. doi:10.1001/jamaneurol.2016.0389 PMID 27088781

Cao, L., Nitzsche, N., McDonnell, A., Alexandrou, A., Saintot, P-P., Loucif, A.J.C., Brown, A.R., Young, G., Mis, M., Randall, A., Waxman, S.G., Stanley, P., Kirby, S., Tarabar, S., Gutteridge, A., Butt, R., McKernan, R.M., Whiting, R., Ali, Z., Bilsland, J., Stevens, E.B. Pharmacological reversal of pain phenotype in iPSC-derived sensory neurons and human subjects with inherited erythromelalgia. Sci. Transla. Med., 8(335): 335ra56, 2016. doi:10.1126/scitranslmed.aad7653 PMID 27099175

Zakrzewska, J.M., Palmer, J., Morisset, V., Giblin, G.M.P., Obermann, M., Ettlin, D.A., Cruccu, G., Bendtsen, L., Estacion, M., Derjean, D., Waxman, S.G., Layton, G., Gunn, K., and Tate, S. Safety and efficacy of a NaV1.7-selective sodium channel blocker in trigeminal neuralgia: a double-blind, placebo-controlled, randomized withdrawal phase 2a trial. Lancet Neurology, 16(4):291-300, 2017. doi:10.1016/S1474-4422(17)30005-4 PMID: 28216232

Huang, J., Vanoye, C.G., Cutts, C., Goldberg, Y.P., Dib-Hajj, S.D., Cohen, C.J., Waxman, S.G., and George, A.L. Sodium channel Na_{V}1.9 mutations associated with insensitivity to pain dampen neuronal excitability. Journal of Clinical Investigation, 127(7):2805-2814, 2017. doi:10.1172/JCI92373 PMID 28530638

Akin, E.J., Higerd, G.P., Mis, M.S., Tanaka, B.S., Adi, T., Liu, S., Dib-Hajj, F.B., Waxman, S.G., and Dib-Hajj, S.D. Building sensory axons: delivery and distributions of Na_{V}1.7 channels and effects of inflammatory mediators. Sci. Adv., 5(10):eaax4755. doi:10.1126/sciadv.aax4755 PMID 31681845

Vrselja, Z., Daniele, S.G., Silbereis, J., Talpo, F., Morozov, Y.M., Sousa, A.M.M., Tanaka, B.S., Skarica, M., Pletikos, M., Kaur, N., Zhuang, Z.W., Liu, Z., Alkawadri, R., Sinusas, A.J., Latham, S., Waxman, S.G., and Sestan, N. Restoration of brain circulation and cellular functions hours postmortem. Nature, 568(7752):336-343, 2019. doi:10.1038/s41586-019-1099-1 PMID: 30996318

Mis., M., Yang, Y., Tanaka, B., Gomis-Perez, C., Liu, S., Dib-Hajj, F., Adi, T., Garcia-Milian, R., Schulman, B., Dib-Hajj, S., and Waxman, S. Resilience to pain: A peripheral component identified using induced pluripotent stem cells and dynamic clamp. Journal of Neuroscience, 39(3):382-392, 2019. doi:10.1523/JNEUROSCI.2433-18.2018 PMID 30459225

Gualdani, R., Gailly, P., Yuan, J-H., Yerna, X., DiStefano, G., Truini, A., Cruccu, G., Dib-Hajj, S., and Waxman, S.G. A TRPM7 mutation linked to familial trigeminal neuralgia: omega current and hyperexcitability of trigeminal ganglion neurons. Proceedings of the National Academy of Sciences – U.S.A., 119(38):e2119630119, 2022. doi:10.1073/pnas.2119630119 PMID 36095216

Higerd-Rusli, G.P., Tyagi, S., Baker, C.A., Liu, S., Dib-Hajj, F.B., Dib-Hajj, S.D., and Waxman, S.G. Inflammation differentially controls transport of depolarizing Nav versus hyperpolarizing Kv channels to drive rat nociceptor activity. Proceedings of the National Academy of Sciences – U.S.A., 120(11):e2215417120, 2023. doi:10.1073/pnas.2215417120 PMID 36897973

Waxman, S.G. Targeting a Peripheral Sodium Channel to Treat Pain. New England Journal of Medicine, 389(5):466-469, 2023. doi:10.1056/NEJMe2305708 PMID 37530829
