= Proceedings of the Association of American Physicians =

- Discipline: Medicine
- Language: English

Publication details
- History: 1886-1999
- Publisher: Wiley-Blackwell (United States)
- Frequency: Bimonthly

Standard abbreviations
- ISO 4: Proc. Assoc. Am. Physicians

Indexing
- ISSN: 0066-9458

Links
- Journal homepage

The Proceedings of the Association of American Physicians was an American medical journal founded in 1886 as the Transactions of the Association of American Physicians. It changed its name in 1996 and ceased publication in 1999.
