= James J. Peters VA Medical Center =

- Veterans Health Administration

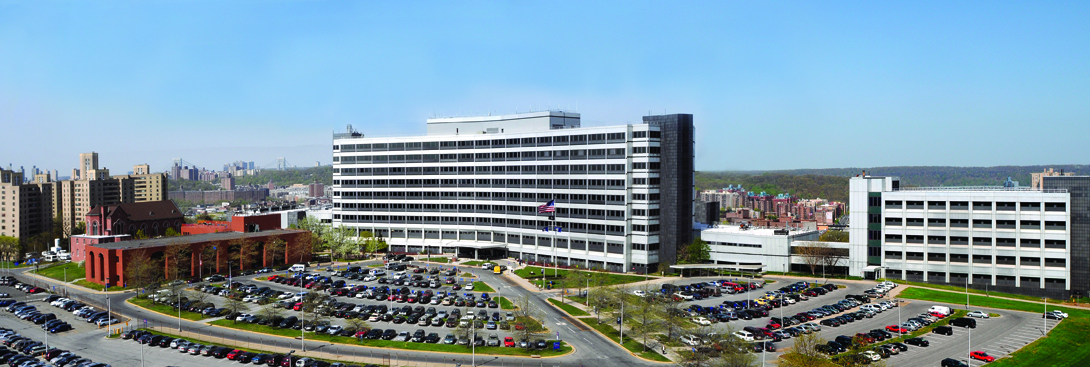
- Left: chapel, and nursing home. Center: main facility. Right: research building.

Geography
- Location: Fordham, The Bronx, New York, United States
- Coordinates: 40°52′02″N 73°54′22″W

Organization
- Care system: Veterans Health Administration
- Type: Teaching
- Affiliated university: Icahn School of Medicine, North Central Bronx Hospital Hospital for Special Surgery
- Network: Veterans Integrated Service Networks 2: VA NY/NJ Veterans Healthcare Network

Services
- Beds: 311 hospital and 120 nursing home beds

History
- Former names: United States Veterans' Hospital No. 81; Bronx Veterans Hospital; Bronx Veterans Administration Hospital; Bronx Veterans Administration Medical Center
- Opened: April 15, 1922; 104 years ago original campus; 1981 current main building; 1985 research building

Links
- Website: www.bronx.va.gov
- Lists: Hospitals in New York State
- Other links: Hospitals in The Bronx

The James J. Peters VA Medical Center (also known as the Bronx Veterans Hospital) is a US Department of Veterans Affairs hospital complex located at 130 West Kingsbridge Road in West Fordham, Bronx, New York City. The hospital is the headquarters of the Veterans Integrated Service Networks New York/New Jersey VA Health Care Network. This network is also the parent network to VA New York Harbor Healthcare System.

The campus falls under the jurisdiction of the United States Department of Veterans Affairs Police and the United States Department of Veterans Affairs, Office of Inspector General.

== History ==
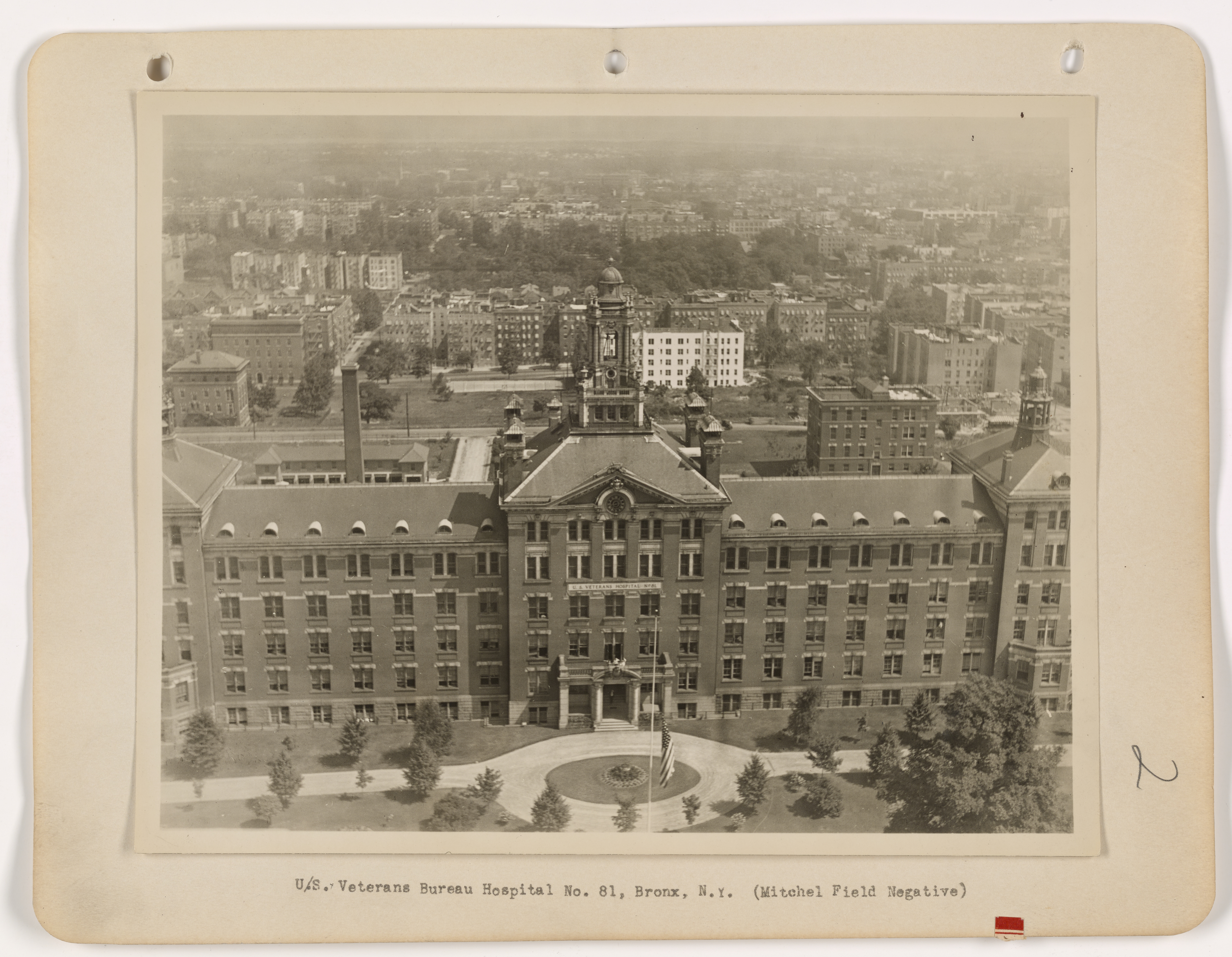
The original United States Veterans' Hospital No. 81 building

During the American Revolutionary War, the site of the medical center was the location of British '"Fort Number 6" (1777–1779). During the 19th century, the land was part of the estate of Nathaniel Platt Bailey. The site then became the property of the Sisters of Charity of New York who turned it into the Bronx Roman Catholic Orphan Asylum. The hospital opened as United States Veterans' Hospital no. 81 on April 15, 1922.

By the 1970s, the original hospital had deteriorated to the point that a Life magazine article was written about it. One of the hospital's patients during this time period was Ron Kovic, who described the hospital as having "deplorable conditions". The hospital was eventually rebuilt in the late 1970s.

In 2002, the Bronx Veterans hospital was renamed after James J. Peters. Peters, a US Army veteran and patient at the Bronx Veterans Hospital, founded several organizations to address the needs of patients with spinal cord injuries, including the United Spinal Association (originally known as the Eastern Paralyzed Veterans Association).

== Research ==
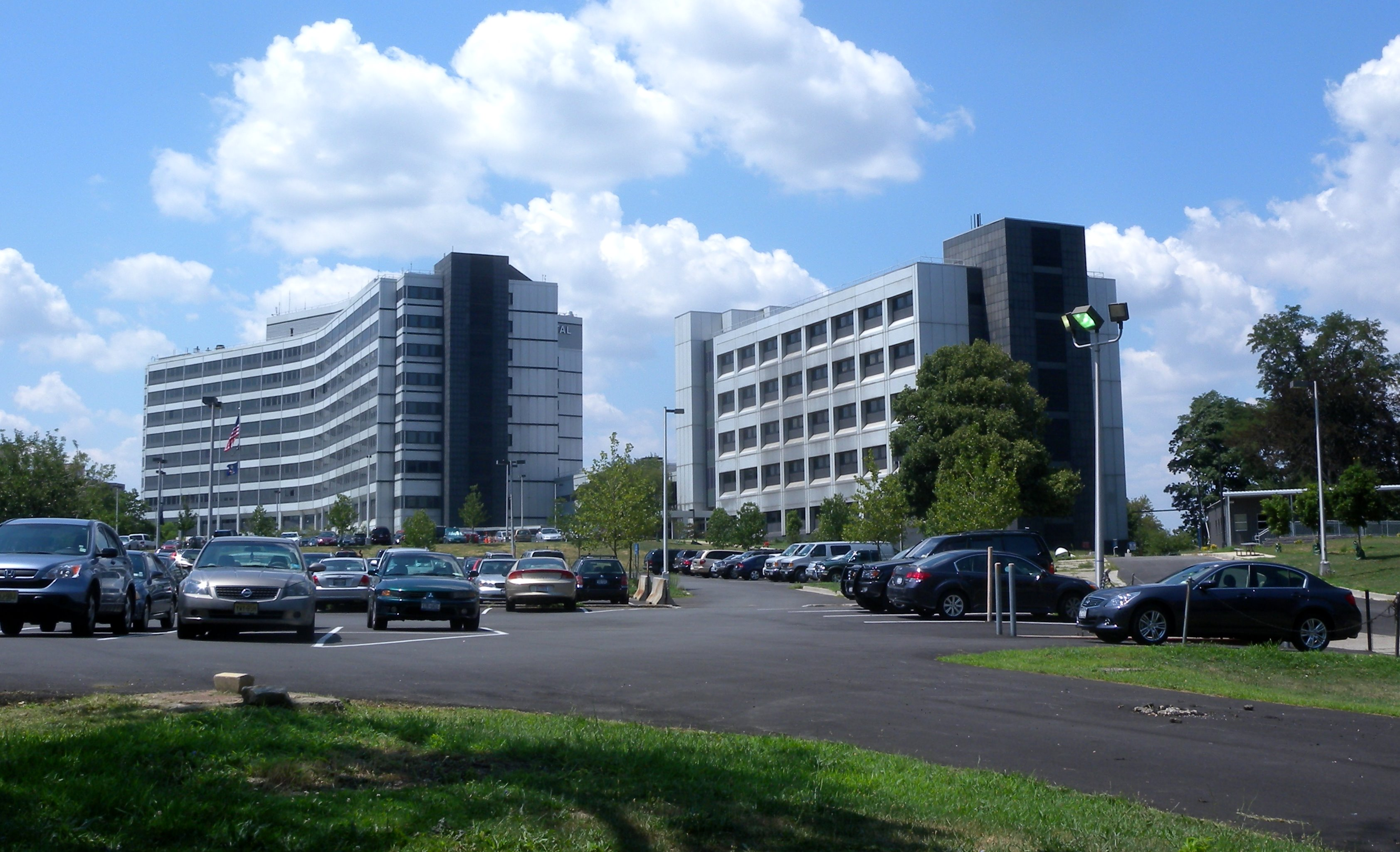
Research building is to the right

The hospital has been a center of medical research for decades. Ludwik Gross, who became the director of the Cancer Research Division, started his research at the hospital in 1944. Beginning in the 1950s, Rosalyn Sussman Yalow and Solomon Berson conducted research into radioimmunoassay. The research culminated in Yalow receiving the 1977 Nobel Prize in Physiology or Medicine. Her collaborator, Berson, who died in 1972, was not eligible for the prize (Nobel prizes are not awarded posthumously). In 1966, James Cimino and Michael J. Brescia developed the Cimino-Brescia fistula.

In 1985, a building dedicated to medical research was constructed and connected to the main building. The research building contains the Spinal Cord Damage Research Center, established due to the efforts of the Eastern Paralyzed Veterans Association (now United Spinal Association) and its director James J. Peters.

== Personnel ==
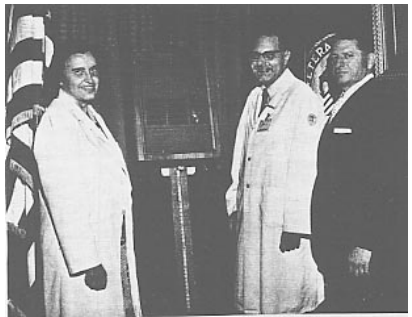
Sterling and Yalow receiving Middleton Award 1973

- Rosalyn Sussman Yalow – Nobel laureate. Collaborated with Solomon Berson to develop radioimmunoassay.
- Solomon Berson – Collaborated with Rosalyn Sussman Yalow to develop radioimmunoassay.
- Nicholas J. Cifarelli – Nephrology. Later pioneered the first Bioethics Advisory Committee in the United States.
- James Cimino – Developed the Cimino-Brescia fistula with Michael J. Brescia.
- Paul R. Cunningham - Surgeon. Later dean of Brody School of Medicine at East Carolina University.
- Shimon Glick - Worked in the laboratory of Berson and Yalow. Dean of the Faculty of Health Sciences at Ben Gurion University.
- Ludwik Gross – Director of the Cancer Research Division. Isolated murine polyomavirus.
- Victor Herbert – Hematologist. Worked in the Nutrition Research Laboratory. Known for folate and megaloblastic anemia research.
- David B. Levine – Orthopaedic surgeon. Various positions at the Hospital for Special Surgery.
- Charles S. Lieber – Clinical nutritionist. Known for research into excess alcohol consumption and cirrhosis of the liver.
- Giulio Maria Pasinetti – Director of the Translational Neuroscience Laboratories. Known for neurology at the Icahn School of Medicine.
- Jesse Roth – Insulin researcher.
- Kenneth Sterling – Director of the protein research laboratory. Later made significant discoveries on thyroid hormone activation.
- Larry J. Siever – Psychiatrist known for his contributions to the study of personality disorders.

== Deaths of notable people ==
- Eric Burroughs – American stage and radio actor.
- Isaac Woodard – African-American World War II veteran and victim of racial violence.
- Timothy Wright – Grammy-nominated gospel singer and pastor.

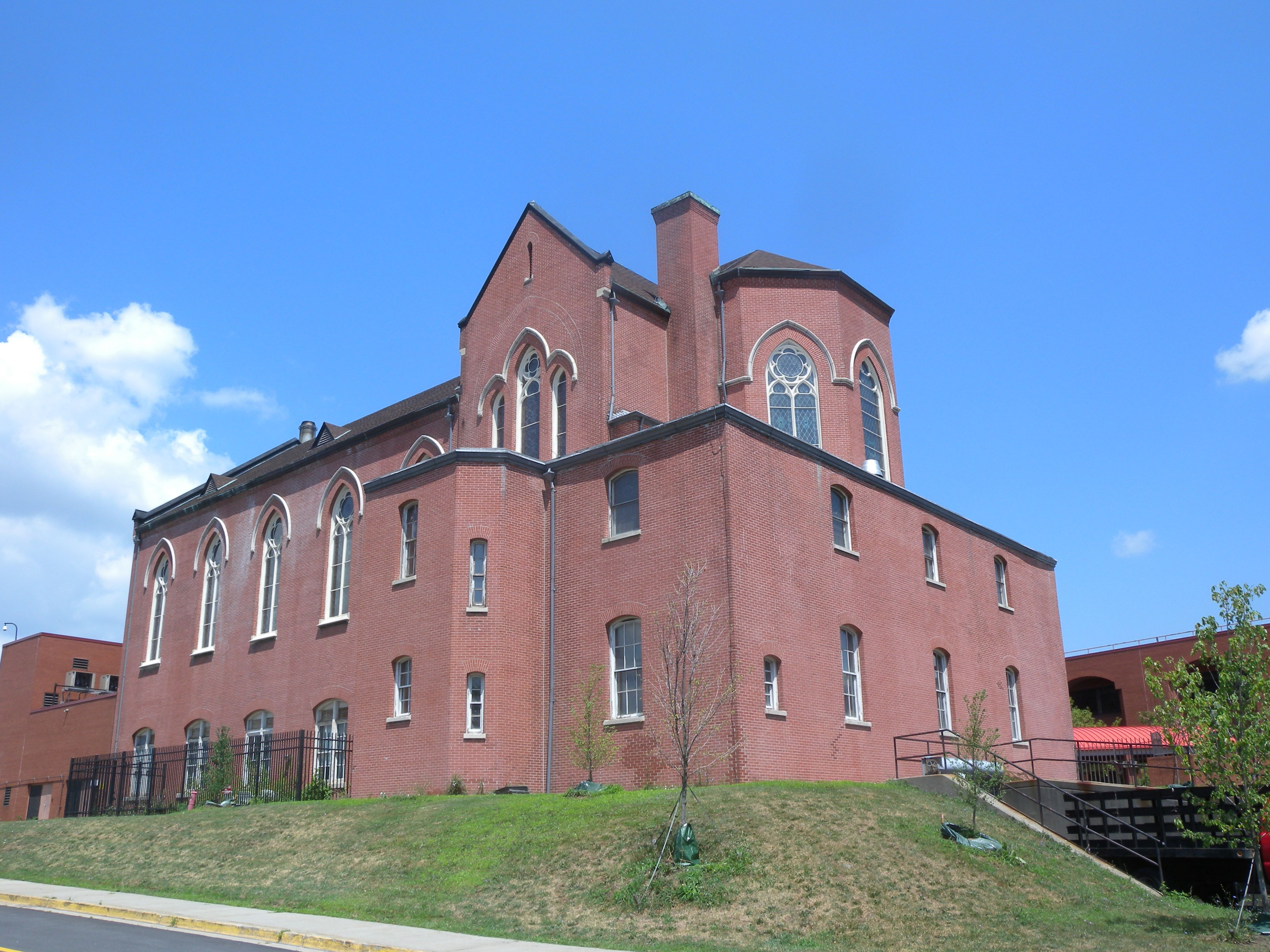
Boy's chapel at the Bronx VA Hospital

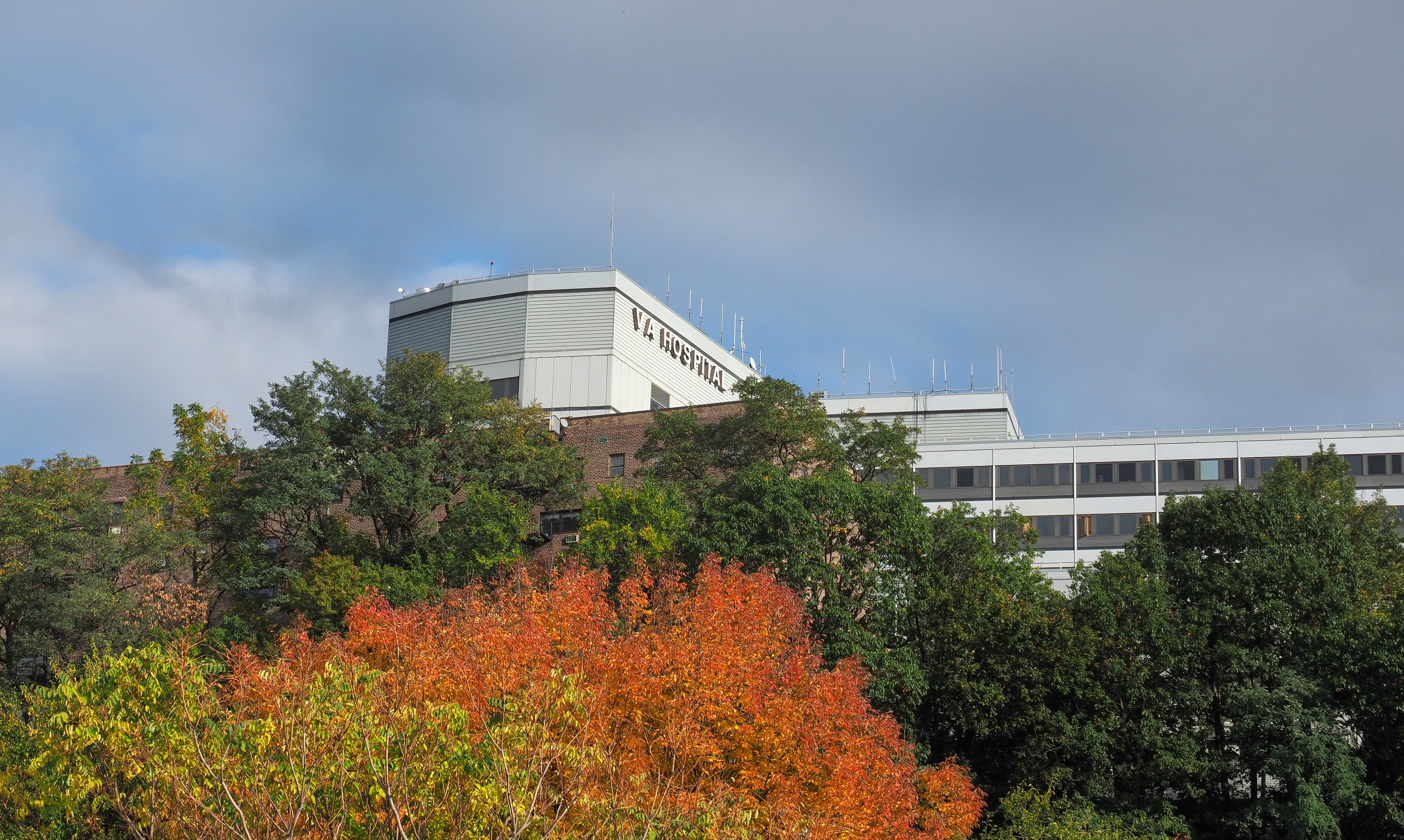
Looking up the University Heights hill from the Bronx shoreline

== See also ==
- Veterans Health Administration
- United Spinal Association
- VA New York Harbor Healthcare System
- Ron Kovic – patient in 1968. Author of Born on the Fourth of July
- Born on the Fourth of July – film based on Ron Kovic's autobiography
