= Elizabeth Forbes =

Elizabeth Forbes may refer to:

- Elizabeth Forbes (musicologist) (1924–2014), English author, music critic, and musicologist
- Elizabeth Forbes (artist) (1859–1912), Canadian artist
- Elizabeth Margaret Forbes (1917–1999), Canadian radiologist
- Betty Forbes (1916–2002), New Zealand track and field athlete
