= Meghan Azad =

- Education: University of Winnipeg; University of London; University of Manitoba
- Scientific career
- Fields: Pediatrics, epidemiology
- Workplaces: University of Manitoba

Meghan B. Azad is a Canadian biomedical scientist and epidemiologist who is a professor of mediatrics and child health at the University of Manitoba. She holds a Tier 2 Canada Research Chair in early nutrition and the developmental origins of health and disease.

== Life ==
Azad earned a B.S. with honors in biochemistry at the University of Winnipeg. She completed a M.Sc. in epidemiology at the London School of Hygiene and Tropical Medicine. She earned a Ph.D. in biochemistry and medical genetics at the University of Manitoba. Azad completed a Banting Postdoctoral Fellowship in pediatrics at the University of Alberta.

Azad is a professor of pediatrics and child health at the University of Manitoba where she co-directs the Manitoba Interdisciplinary Lactation Centre (MILC) She is a Tier 2 Canada Research Chair in early nutrition and the developmental origins of health and disease. She researches infant nutrition and the microbiome and how their impacts on child growth, resilience, and development.

Azad is an elected member of the Royal Society of Canada College of New Scholars and the U.S. National Academy of Medicine.
