= Flame of Hope =

Flame of Hope may refer to:

- Flame of Hope (Special Olympics), symbol of the Special Olympics
- Flame of Hope (diabetes), tribute to Dr. Frederick Banting
- Eternal Flame of Hope, tribute to disabled people on Pecaut Square in Toronto.
- The Flame of Hope, failed flame, formerly at Centenary Square in Birmingham, England
- "Flame of Hope", song from the album The Pacific Age by Orchestral Manoeuvres in the Dark
