= Moses Barron =

American doctor and researcher

Moses Barron (1884 – 22 December 1974) was a medical doctor and researcher. Born in Russia, he was brought to the United States by his parents at age 5 and grew up in Minnesota. He received a medical degree from the University of Minnesota in 1911. He served as a medical officer in France in World War 1, and later became a Clinical Professor of Medicine at the University of Minnesota. In 1920 he published an article, "The relation of the Islets of Langerhans to Diabetes," which noted the importance of the islet cells of the pancreas in relation to diabetes. It inspired Dr. Frederick Banting's research in diabetes, which led to the Nobel Prize winning discovery of insulin as a treatment for diabetes. Barron retired as professor in 1952.

Dr. Moses Barron became Mount Sinai Hospital's first Chief of Staff in February 1951. The seven-story, 197 bed facility was the most modern hospital in the community at the time. Its creation served two purposes: Jewish physicians who had been denied admitting privileges at other city hospitals could now practice medicine, and the founders garnered enormous civic prestige. It was the first private non-sectarian hospital in the community to accept members of minority races on its medical staff. The hospital was located at Chicago Avenue at 22nd St. In 1990 it merged with Metropolitan Medical Center to become Metropolitan-Mount Sinai; in 1991 they closed their doors.
