= Banting (crater) =

Lunar impact crater

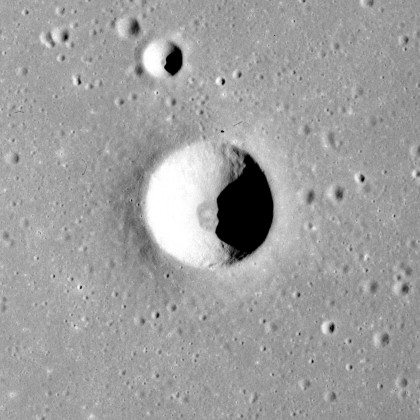
- Apollo 15 image
- Coordinates: 26.6°N 16.4°E
- Diameter: 5.15 km (3.20 mi)
- Depth: 0.85 km (0.53 mi)
- Colongitude: 346° at sunrise
- Eponym: Frederick Banting

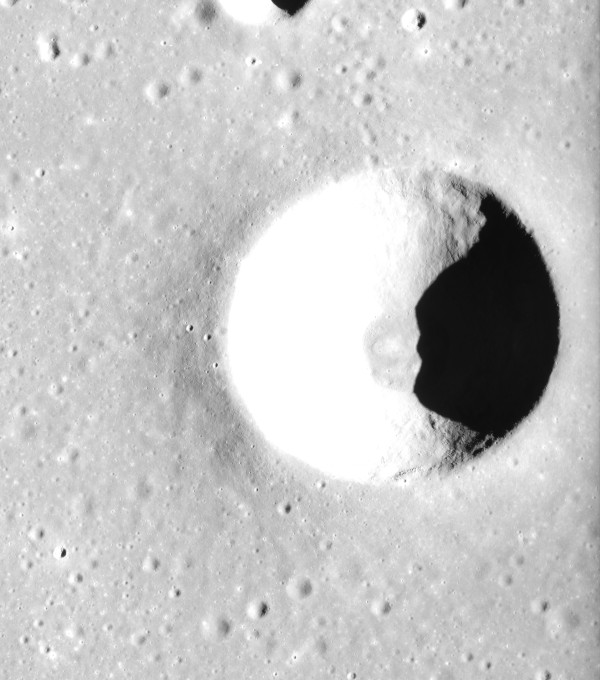
Oblique view of Banting from Apollo 15

Banting is a small, bowl-shaped lunar impact crater located near the middle of the Mare Serenitatis on the Earth's moon.

Originally named Linné E, in 1973 the crater was renamed for Sir Frederick Banting in honour of his outstanding medical contributions – the most famous being his discovery of insulin. Linné itself, named after the 18th-century Swedish botanist Carl von Linné, lies to the west-northwest.

== Naming ==
"Banting" was one of approximately fifty new names for lunar craters adopted by the International Astronomical Union in 1973. Choosing the names was the first step in the adoption of a new policy that involved broadening crater nomenclature.

The policy was created because of photographs taken by the Apollo spacecraft, which provided an extremely detailed and crater-populated lunar map, essentially proving that a greater variety of names would be needed. The practice that had previously been used was to name one large crater after a selected individual and to name the small craters around it with the same name followed by different letters of the alphabet.

The new policy allowed deceased scientists who had contributed to biological knowledge, like Dr. Banting – as well as scientists from other fields and contributors to culture and knowledge, such as writers, composers, and artists – to have craters named after them. Previously, only the names of astronomers, others who had made important contributions to astronomy, and historical philosophers had been used.

== Description ==
Banting is a 4-mile-wide (6.4 km) "simple" impact crater. It is located in the Sea of Serenity, which is also known as Mare Serenitatis, a large patch of lunar mare. Maria like Mare Serenitatis are dark, smooth areas created by lava pooling on the surface and then cooling, covering up any previously existing craters. They were originally called maria ("seas") because astronomers believed they were bodies of water.

Banting is flanked by two U.S. lunar landing sites – those of Apollo 15 and 17 – which lie several hundred miles on either side of the crater.

== Viewing ==
Mare Serenitatis is frequently perceived to be the eastern eye of the Man in the Moon. The Man in the Moon is on the near side of the Moon, which constantly faces Earth because of its tidally locked orbit. This makes Sir Frederick's crater fairly central, since Mare Serenitatis is so easily viewed.

Despite its location, Banting is a very small crater and can be difficult to see. A telescope must be used, and viewing during certain lunar phases is crucial to seeing such small craters, as well. It is recommended that, while it is waxing, the moon be viewed around the time of its first quarter; while it is waning, it should be viewed just before its last quarter. Craters may also be conspicuous during a gibbous moon, when it is between quarter and full. These phases all provide just enough shadow to outline the details of the lunar surface without its being too dark, whereas the full moon is too bright, washing out all details.

== See also ==
- List of craters on the Moon
- List of lunar features
