= Elizabeth Margaret Forbes =

Canadian radiologist

Dr. Elizabeth Margaret Forbes
- Born: March 25, 1917; Blenheim, Ontario, Canada
- Died: September 20, 1999 (aged 82)
- Education: Canada Business College (1935), Western University (M.D., 1942)
- Occupation: Radiologist
- Years active: 1942–1975
- Employer(s): Women’s College Hospital, University of Toronto, St. Joseph’s Hospital, Victoria Hospital

Elizabeth Margaret Forbes (March 25, 1917 – September 20, 1999) was a Canadian radiologist. Forbes was the Chief of Radiology at Toronto's Women's College Hospital (WCH) from 1955 to 1975. She is remembered for co-authoring "one of the first Canadian papers on mammography" with WCH's Henrietta Banting.

== Early life and education ==
Elizabeth Margaret Forbes was born on March 25, 1917, in Blenheim, Ontario. In 1934 she attended Canada Business College for one year. After graduation she undertook secretarial and general office work for one year. After deciding to pursue medicine, Forbes enrolled in Western University’s medical school and graduated with an MD in 1942. She originally specialized in family medicine and completed a Junior Rotating Internship at St. Joseph's Hospital in Hamilton, Ontario. Following that, she joined the staff of Victoria Hospital and St. Joseph's Hospital, London, Ontario, from 1943 to 1951.

After deciding to further specialize in radiology, Forbes pursued a residency in radiology at the Cleveland Clinic in Ohio in 1952. Shortly thereafter, she become a resident in radiology at the Strong Memorial Hospital in New York from 1953 to 1954. She became certified in Diagnostic Radiology from the Royal College of Physicians and Surgeons of Canada. That same year she was named a diplomate in Diagnostic Radiology of the American Board of Radiology.

== Career ==
Forbes joined the staff of Women's College Hospital as the Chief of Radiology in 1955. She began her career in radiology as one of the few female radiologists in Canada. According to a 1964 article in Canadian Doctor, in the early 1960s only 17 women were qualified radiologists in Canada. During her time at Women's College Hospital she co-authored a study, with Dr. Henrietta Banting, on the use of mammography as a diagnostic tool. Under her leadership, the WCH became the first hospital in Ontario to use mammography to detect breast cancer. In 1966 she was appointed as an associate professor in the University of Toronto's Faculty of Medicine.

During her career she was a member of several associations, including: the Canadian Medical Association, the Canadian Association of Radiologists, the American College of Radiology, the Radiological Society of North America, and the Toronto Radiological Society. In 1974 she was awarded a fellowship from the American College of Radiology, becoming the first Canadian women to do so.

== Retirement ==
Forbes retired as the Chief of Radiology of Women's College Hospital on January 8, 1975. She died on September 20, 1999.
