= Frederick Banting =

Canadian medical scientist and doctor (1891–1941)

Sir Frederick Banting KBE MC FRS FRSC FRCS FRCP
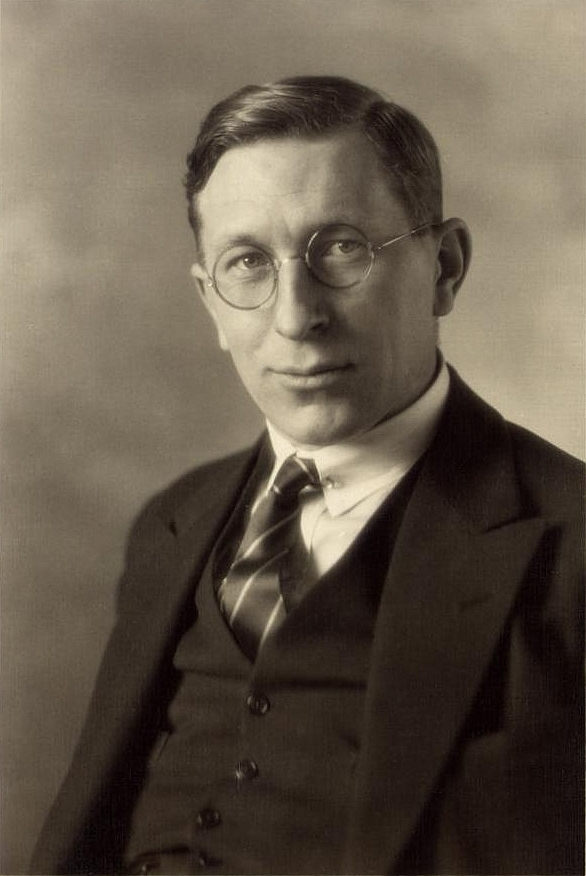
- Banting in 1923
- Born: November 14, 1891; Near Alliston, Ontario, Canada
- Died: February 21, 1941 (aged 49); Near Musgrave Harbour, Dominion of Newfoundland
- Burial place: Mount Pleasant Cemetery
- Education: University of Toronto (MB, MD)
- Known for: Discovery of insulin
- Spouses: Marion Robertson (m. 1924; div. 1932); Henrietta Ball (m. 1937)
- Children: 1
- Awards: Nobel Prize in Physiology or Medicine (1923); John Scott Medal (1923); Cameron Prize for Therapeutics (1927); Flavelle Medal (1931); Fellow of the Royal Society (1935)
- Scientific career
- Fields: Pharmacology
- Workplaces: University of Western Ontario; University of Toronto
- Notable students: Charles Best
- Military career
- Branch: Royal Canadian Army Medical Corps
- Service years: 1915–1919
- Rank: Captain
- Conflicts: World War I; Battle of Amiens; Battle of Cambrai
- Awards: Military Cross (1919)

Sir Frederick Grant Banting (/ˈbæntiŋ/; November 14, 1891 – February 21, 1941) was a Canadian pharmacologist, orthopedist, and field surgeon. For his co-discovery of insulin and its therapeutic potential, Banting was awarded the Nobel Prize in Physiology or Medicine with John Macleod.

Banting and his student, Charles Best, isolated insulin at the University of Toronto in the lab of Scottish physiologist John Macleod. When he and Macleod received the 1923 Nobel Prize in Physiology or Medicine, Banting shared the honours and award money with Best. That same year, the Government of Canada granted Banting a lifetime annuity to continue his work. He is the youngest Nobel laureate for Physiology/Medicine, at 32.

== Early life ==
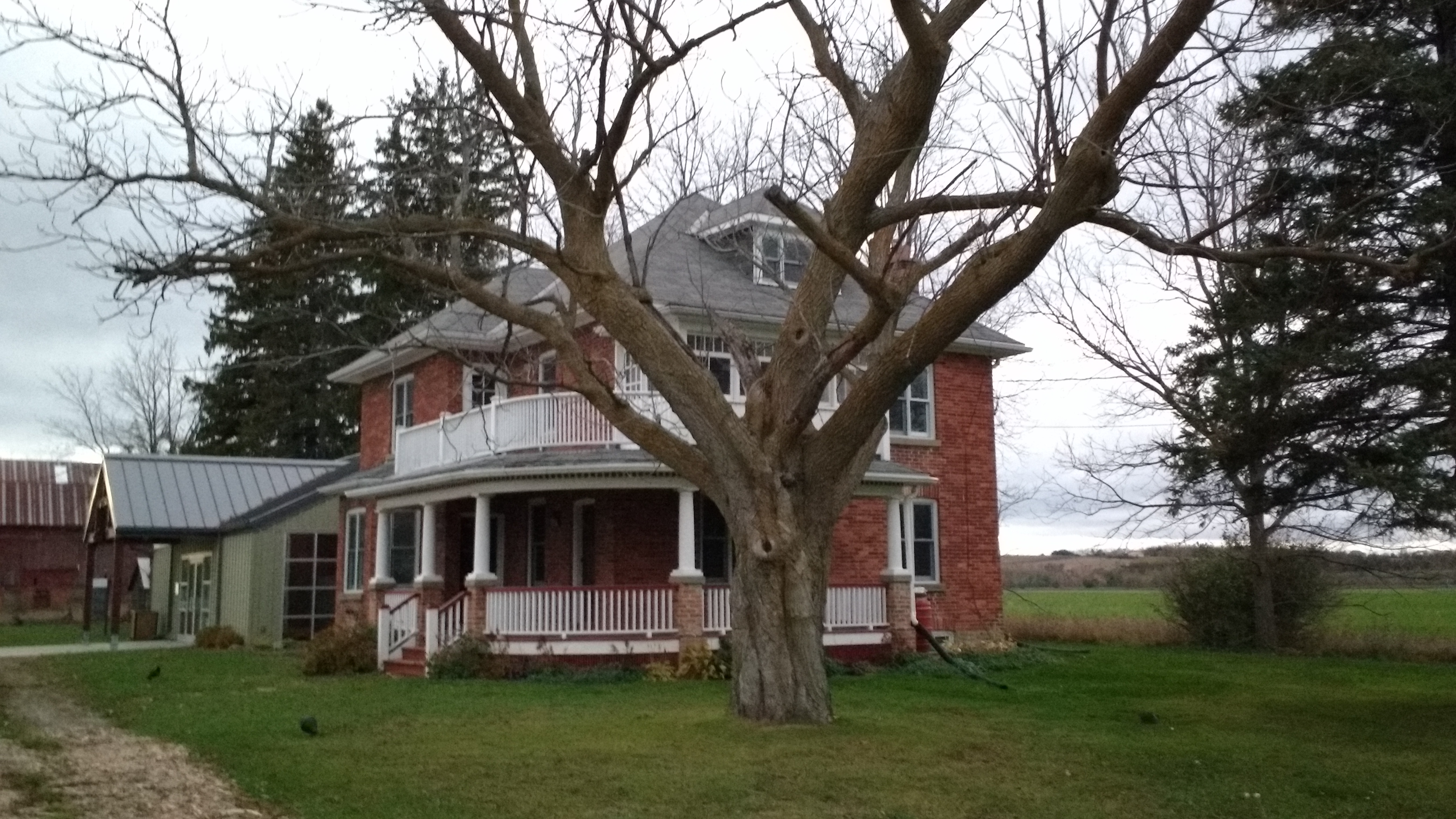
The Banting farm is preserved under the Ontario Heritage Act, with a commemorative plaque from the government

Banting was born on November 14, 1891, in his family's farmhouse 3.2 km (2 mi) from Alliston, Ontario. He was the youngest of five children of William Thompson Banting, a farmer in New Tecumseth, and Margaret Grant, the daughter of a mill manager. The Bantings were a financially stable family of British and Northern Irish origin. Banting's distant relative, the London-based undertaker William Banting, popularised a weight-loss diet in 1864, and the word "Banting" entered the Oxford English Dictionary as its description. His mother's relatives, the Grants, were of Scottish descent.

With his family being located within a secure rural community, Banting was raised in prosperous circumstances. He was often called "Fred" or "Freddie." Farm life largely defined most of his boyhood. He felt excluded from his siblings, all multiple years his senior, and recalled that "my older brothers could not be bothered with me for the most part." When he began schooling at the age of seven, Banting was a shy, asocial boy who tired of the attendance and was bullied frequently. Early difficulties with spelling ensured poor marks in exams: "I simply could not spell. Every word seemed to have about three ways of spelling. It was a guess and I invariably guessed wrong." He later attributed these experiences as being the product of an inferiority complex.

During his childhood, Banting devoted himself to farmwork, grew close with his mother, and sympathised with animals in the absence of other company. Marion Walwyn, a cousin who first met Banting in 1901, recalled that "we sat together in the swing in our yard. In an hour he didn't say one word." He continued to struggle in school and stubbornly resisted being disciplined there. After one incident, he resolved never to continue his education but was convinced otherwise by his father. Banting's grandfather, John Banting, had urged his own children to be educated; the philosophy had influenced William, who offered to provide a fund to his sons when they turned twenty-one. In contrast to his brothers, who spent the inheritance towards their own farms, Frederick would use it towards matriculation.

In his late teenage years, Banting grew into a tall man with engagements in school football and baseball teams. Both his mother and father hoped that he would find a vocation in the Methodist ministry. He passed physics and chemistry during junior matriculation examinations in 1909, but repeated English and was required to undertake French and Latin. The next year, he narrowly passed Latin but failed French and, for a second time, English composition. The principal later remembered his repeated efforts: "We would not have picked him for one on whom fame should settle. He was a white boy, a right boy."

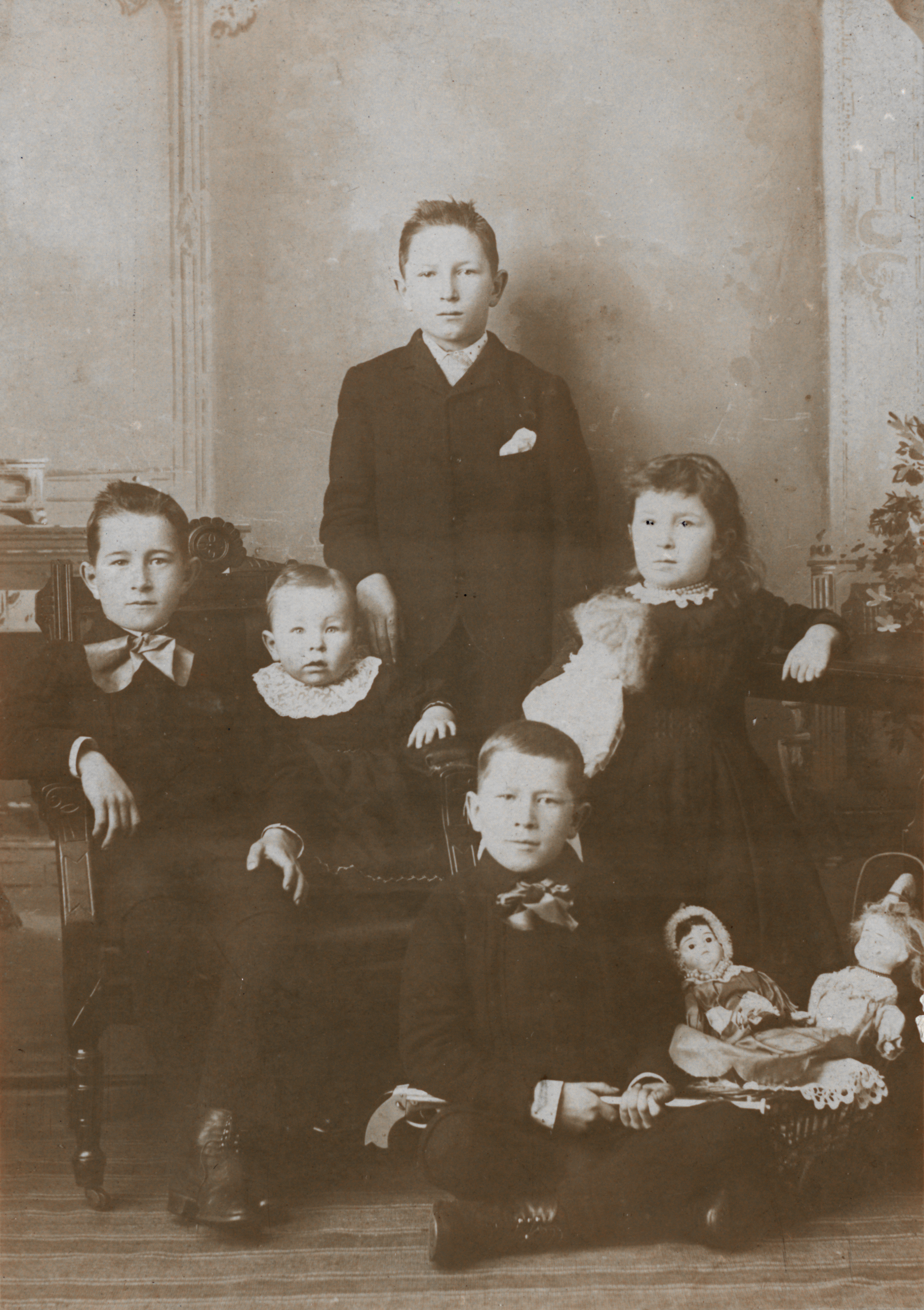
The Banting children, c. 1893

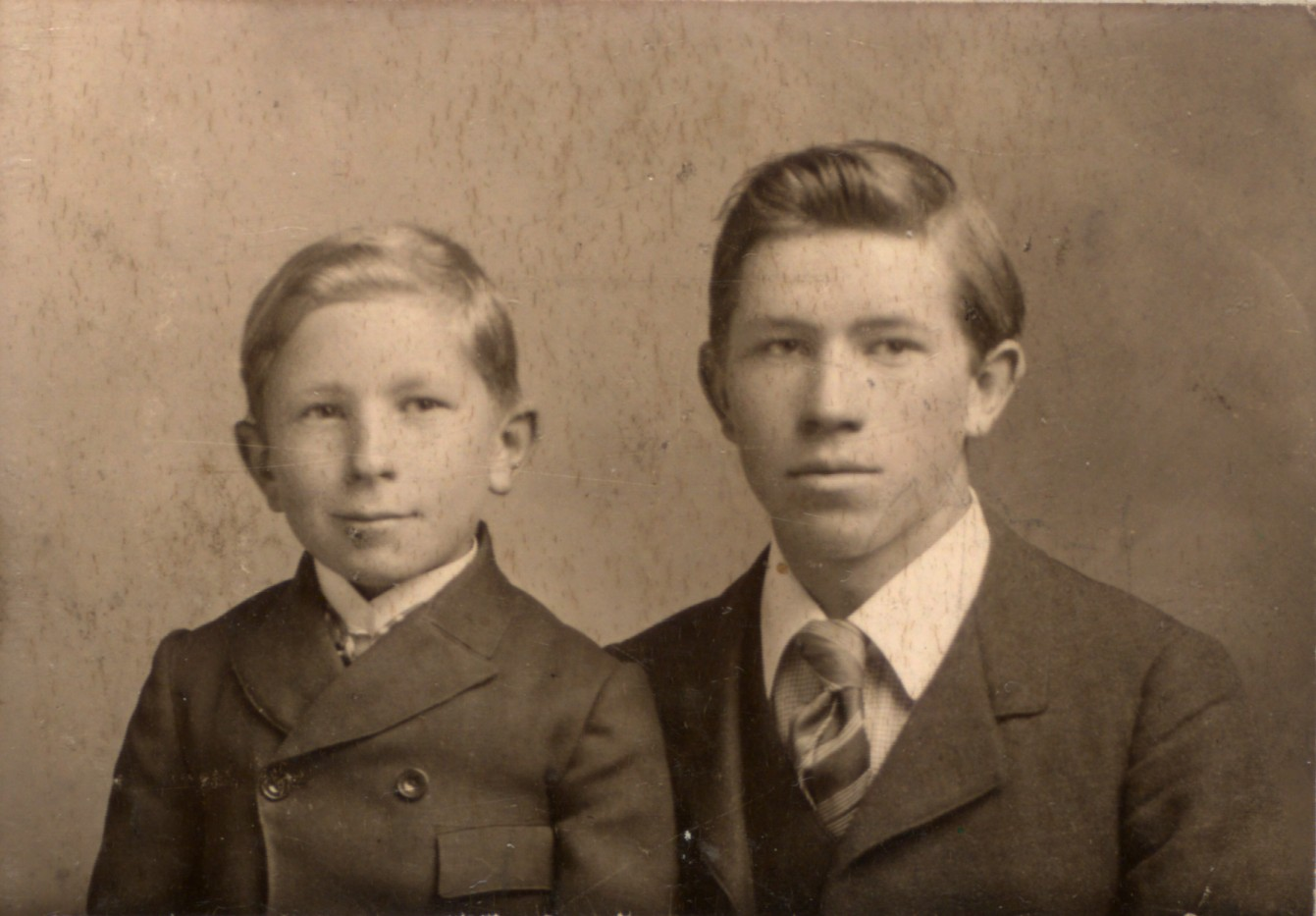
Banting (left), aged 9 or 10, and his brother, Thompson, c. 1900

=== College and service years ===
Banting finally passed examinations in July 1910. He stated on his application to university that he wished to be a teacher, although he also harbored aspirations of becoming a doctor. He toured the Canadian West for the summer, traveling to Winnipeg and Calgary, before enrolling at the University of Toronto, where he entered the General Arts course at Victoria College. Despite hard work, Banting failed his first year, but decided to become a doctor and returned to repeat the year. He petitioned to join the medical program in February 1912 and was accepted. In September, he dropped out of Victoria College to begin medical school at the University of Toronto.

Banting established himself in medical school by working diligently. His roommate, Sam Graham, remembered him for studying late into the night. Besides being a successful rugby player, however, he was otherwise undistinguished. His grades—now without the burden of language courses—saw a marked improvement, averaging approximately a B, an above-average score. Summers were spent returning to work at the farm. At Toronto's Faculty of Medicine, Banting specialised in surgery.

At the onset of World War I, Banting, along with most Canadian men, sought to enlist in the army. He attempted to enter the Canadian Expeditionary Force on August 16, 1914, the day after Canada's declaration of war, and then again in October, but was refused twice due to poor vision. In his third year of medical school Banting successfully joined the Royal Canadian Army Medical Corps in 1915 and was commissioned a private, then promoted to sergeant. He trained at a camp at Niagara Falls for the summer before his fourth year of school. The university accelerated the class by condensing the fifth year of medical school during the summer of 1916. The curriculum emphasized surgical procedure and trauma; a lecture dedicated to the treatment of diabetes derived itself from Frederick Madison Allen of the Rockefeller Institute, who recommended that diabetics be placed on a starvation diet for minimum metabolization.

Banting's fourth year was committed to clinical work at Toronto General Hospital. Under the guidance of Clarence L. Starr, the chief surgeon at the Hospital for Sick Children, Banting gained training as an undergraduate house surgeon. By 1915, he had definitively resolved to practice surgery, performing his first operation—the drainage of a soldier's abscess—next winter. On December 9, 1916, Banting graduated with his Bachelor of Medicine (M.B.) and reported for military duty the next day. After being promoted to lieutenant, he sailed from Halifax to Britain on March 26, 1917. Shortly before departing he became engaged to Edith Roach, whom he met in 1911. Starr, an orthopedist who enlisted in 1916, had been impressed by Banting's work as an undergraduate and requested that he join him at the Granville Canadian Special Hospital in Ramsgate, Kent. On May 2, 1917, Banting assumed a position as Starr's assistant.

For thirteen months, Banting assisted Starr, a pioneer of nerve suturing, at Granville Hospital. He oversaw 125 patients and refused to levy a fee for extra services: "it gives me a certain amount of pleasure to be able to help them which repays me in a way that money never could." After some study, he gained certification in obstetrics and gynaecology, and was transferred to serve in France, arriving in June 1918. Banting's first encounter with medical service came on August 8 at the Battle of Amiens. Several days were spent tending to and dressing the wounded on the front lines, in effect, as a general practitioner. In the lull between battles, Banting developed his knowledge of anatomy. Eager to see more active combat, he hoped to be deployed to Siberia with the Canadian Siberian Expeditionary Force.

The 44th Battalion, 4th Canadian Division, where Banting served, were engaged at the Battle of Cambrai in 1918. He witnessed much of the battle's brutality. When a German entered his aid post, Banting's life was saved by a patient, an amputee sergeant, who shot the soldier at the post's door. Later, Banting was struck by shrapnel from an exploding shell, ultimately ending his frontline duty. He wished to remain in battle to continue treating the wounded but his superior, Major L.C. Palmer, insisted otherwise. For his valour, Palmer recommended Banting for decoration. Banting was awarded the Military Cross owing to his "exceptional bravery while attending the wounded under fire."

Banting returned to Canada after the war and went to Toronto to complete his surgical training. In 1918, he was awarded the license to practise medicine, surgery, and midwifery by the Royal College of Physicians of London. He studied orthopedic medicine and, in 1919–1920, was Resident Surgeon at The Hospital for Sick Children. Because he was unable to gain a place on the hospital staff, he decided to move to London, Ontario, to set up a medical practice. After his medical practice proved unsuccessful, Banting returned to general practice from July 1920 to May 1921 and began teaching orthopedics and anthropology part-time at the University of Western Ontario in London, Ontario. From 1921 to 1922 he lectured in pharmacology at the University of Toronto. He received his M.D. degree in 1922, and was also awarded a gold medal.

== Medical research ==
=== Isolation of insulin ===
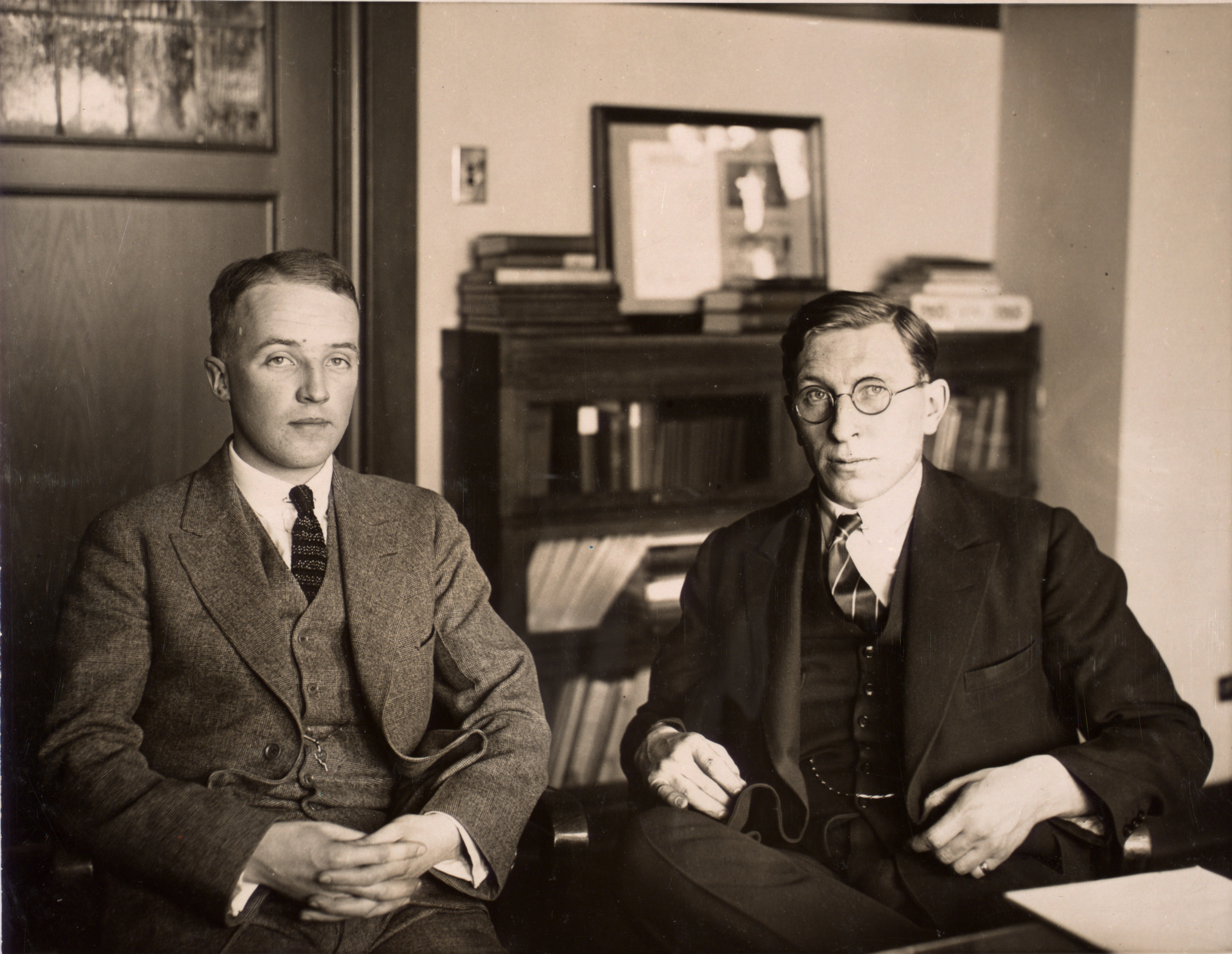
Charles Best and Banting, c. 1924

An article he read about the pancreas piqued Banting's interest in diabetes. Banting had to give a talk on the pancreas to one of his classes at the University of Western Ontario on November 1, 1920, and he was therefore reading reports that other scientists had written. Research by Naunyn, Minkowski, Opie, Sharpey-Schafer, and others suggested that diabetes resulted from a lack of a protein hormone secreted by the islets of Langerhans in the pancreas. Schafer had named this putative hormone "insulin". The hormone was thought to control the metabolism of sugar; its lack led to an increase of sugar in the blood which was then excreted in urine. Attempts to extract insulin from ground-up pancreas cells were unsuccessful, likely because of the destruction of the insulin by the proteolysis enzyme of the pancreas. The challenge was to find a way to extract insulin from the pancreas prior to its destruction.

Moses Barron published an article in 1920 which described experimental closure of the pancreatic duct by ligature; this further influenced Banting's thinking. The procedure caused deterioration of the cells of the pancreas that secrete trypsin which breaks down insulin, but it left the islets of Langerhans intact. Banting realized that this procedure would destroy the trypsin-secreting cells but not the insulin. Once the trypsin-secreting cells had died, insulin could be extracted from the islets of Langerhans. Banting discussed this approach with John Macleod, professor of physiology at the University of Toronto. Macleod provided experimental facilities and the assistance of one of his students, Charles Best. Banting and Best, with the assistance of biochemist James Collip, began the production of insulin by this means.

As the experiments proceeded, the required quantities could no longer be obtained by performing surgery on living dogs. In November 1921, Banting hit upon the idea of obtaining insulin from the fetal pancreas. He removed the pancreases from fetal calves at a William Davies slaughterhouse and found the extracts to be just as potent as those extracted from the dog pancreases. By December 1921, he had also succeeded in extracting insulin from the adult pancreas. Pork and beef would remain the primary commercial sources of insulin until they were replaced by genetically engineered bacteria in the late 20th century. On January 11, 1922, the first ever injection of insulin was given to 14-year-old Canadian Leonard Thompson at Toronto General Hospital. In spring of 1922, Banting established a private practice in Toronto and began to treat diabetic patients. His first American patient was Elizabeth Hughes Gossett, daughter of U.S. Secretary of State Charles Evans Hughes.

Banting and Macleod were jointly awarded the 1923 Nobel Prize in Physiology or Medicine. Banting split his half of the Prize money with Best, and Macleod split the other half of the Prize money with James Collip.

=== After insulin ===
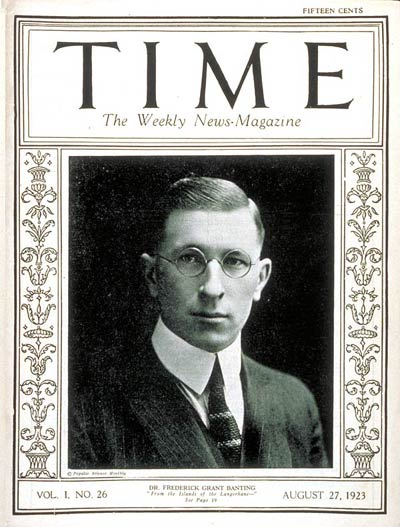
Time cover, August 27, 1923

Banting was appointed Senior Demonstrator in Medicine at the University of Toronto in 1922. Next year he was elected to the new Banting and Best Chair of Medical Research, endowed by the Legislature of the province of Ontario. He also served as Honorary Consulting Physician to the Toronto General, the Hospital for Sick Children, and the Toronto Western Hospital. At the Banting and Best Institute, he focused his research on silicosis, cancer, and the mechanisms of drowning.

In 1938, Banting's interest in aviation medicine resulted in his participation with the Royal Canadian Air Force (RCAF) in research concerning the physiological problems encountered by pilots operating high-altitude combat aircraft. Banting headed the RCAF's Number 1 Clinical Investigation Unit (CIU), which was housed in a secret facility on the grounds of the former Eglinton Hunt Club in Toronto.

During the Second World War he investigated the problems of aviators, such as "blackout" (syncope). He also helped Wilbur Franks with the invention of the G-suit to stop pilots from blacking out when they were subjected to g-forces while turning or diving. Another of Banting's projects during the Second World War involved using and treating mustard gas burns. Banting even tested the gas and antidotes on himself to see if they were effective.

== Public statements ==
=== Statements on Hudson's Bay Company ===
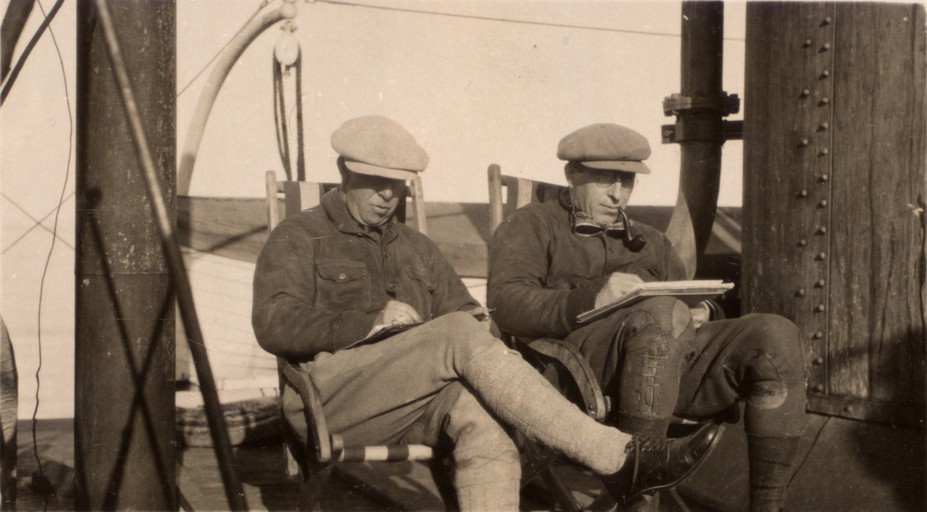
A. Y. Jackson and Banting on the SS Beothic, 1927

During his 1927 Arctic trip with A. Y. Jackson, Banting realized that crew or passengers on board the Hudson's Bay Company (HBC) paddle wheeler SS Distributor were responsible for spreading the influenza virus down the Slave River and Mackenzie River, a virus that had over the summer and autumn spread territory-wide, devastating the aboriginal population of the north. Returning from the trip, Banting gave an interview in Montreal with a Toronto Star reporter under the agreement that his statements on HBC would remain off the record. The conversation was nonetheless published in the Toronto Star and rapidly reached a wide audience across Europe and Australia. Banting was angry at the leak, having promised the Department of the Interior not to make any statements to the press prior to clearing them.

The article noted that Banting had given the journalist C. R. Greenaway repeated instances of how the fox fur trade always favoured the company: "For over $100,000 of fox skins, he estimated that the Eskimos had not received $5,000 worth of goods." He traced this treatment to health, consistent with reports made in previous years by RCMP officers, suggesting that "the result was a diet of 'flour, biscuits, tea and tobacco,' with the skins that once were used for clothing traded merely for 'cheap whiteman's goods.'"

The fur trade commissioner for the Hudson's Bay Company called Banting's remarks "false and slanderous", and a month later, the governor and general manager of HBC met Banting at the King Edward Hotel to demand a retraction. Banting stated that the reporter had betrayed his confidence, but did not retract his statement and reaffirmed that HBC was responsible for the death of indigenous residents by supplying the wrong kind of food and introducing diseases into the Arctic. As A. Y. Jackson notes in his memoir, since neither the governor nor the general manager had been to the Arctic, the meeting ended with them asking Banting's advice on what HBC ought to do: "He gave them some good advice and later he received a card at Christmas with the Governor's best wishes."

Banting also maintained this position in his report to the Department of the Interior:

He noted that "infant mortality was high because of the undernourishment of the mother before birth"; that "white man's food leads to decay of native teeth"; that "tuberculosis has commenced. Saw several cases at Godhavn, Etah, Port Burwell, Arctic Bay"; that "an epidemic resembling influenza killed a considerable proportion of population at Port Burwell"; and that "the gravest danger faces the Eskimo in his transfer from a race-long hunter to a dependent trapper. White flour, sea-biscuits, tea and tobacco do not provide sufficient fuel to warm and nourish him." Furthermore, he discouraged the establishment of an Arctic hospital. The "proposed hospital at Pangnirtung would be a waste of money, as it could be reached by only a few natives." Banting's report contrasted starkly with the bland descriptions provided by the ship's physician, F. H. Stringer.

== Personal life ==
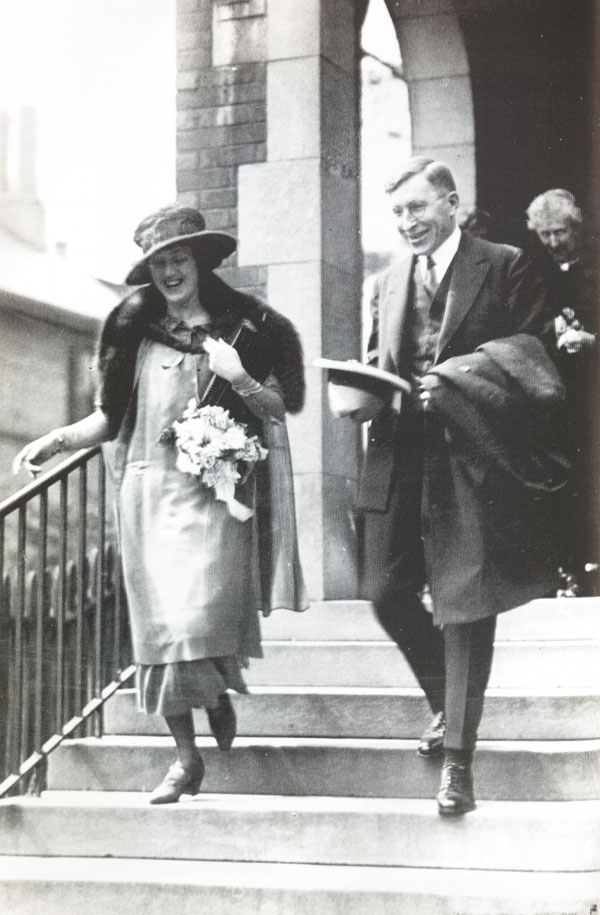
Banting and Marion Robertson on their wedding day

Banting married twice. His first marriage was to Marion Robertson in 1924; they had one child. They divorced in 1932 and Banting married Henrietta Ball in 1937.

=== Painting ===
Banting developed an interest in painting beginning around 1921 while he was in London, Ontario. Some of his first pieces were done on the back of the cardboard in which his shirts were packed by the dry-cleaners. He became friends with the Group of Seven artists A. Y. Jackson and Lawren Harris, fellow members of the Arts and Letters Club of Toronto, sharing their love of the rugged Canadian landscape. Writing on Banting, Jackson recalls that "He did not want to make a business of art and would tell [would-be purchasers] to go buy a Lismer or something else and then he would exchange it for one of his." An obituary said, "A member of the Arts and Letters Club of Toronto, he was one of Canada's most accomplished amateur painters."

In 1927, he made a sketching trip with Jackson to the St. Lawrence River in Quebec. Later that year, they travelled to RCMP outposts in the Arctic on the Canadian government supply ship Beothic. The sketches, done both in oils on birch panels and in pen and ink, were named after the places he visited: Craig Harbour, Ellesmere Island; Pond Inlet, Baylot Island; Eskimo tents at Etach; others were untitled. The Owens Art Gallery at Mount Allison University holds one of Banting’s paintings in its collection, which was donated by Lady Henrietta Banting in 1965. Jackson and Banting also made painting expeditions to Great Slave Lake, Walsh Lake (Northwest Territories), Georgian Bay, French River and the Sudbury District.

At the time of his death in 1941, Banting was one of Canada's best-known amateur painters. Dennis Reid, the former director of Collections and Research at the Art Gallery of Ontario, views Banting's works as very much "part of the Jackson story".

=== Death ===
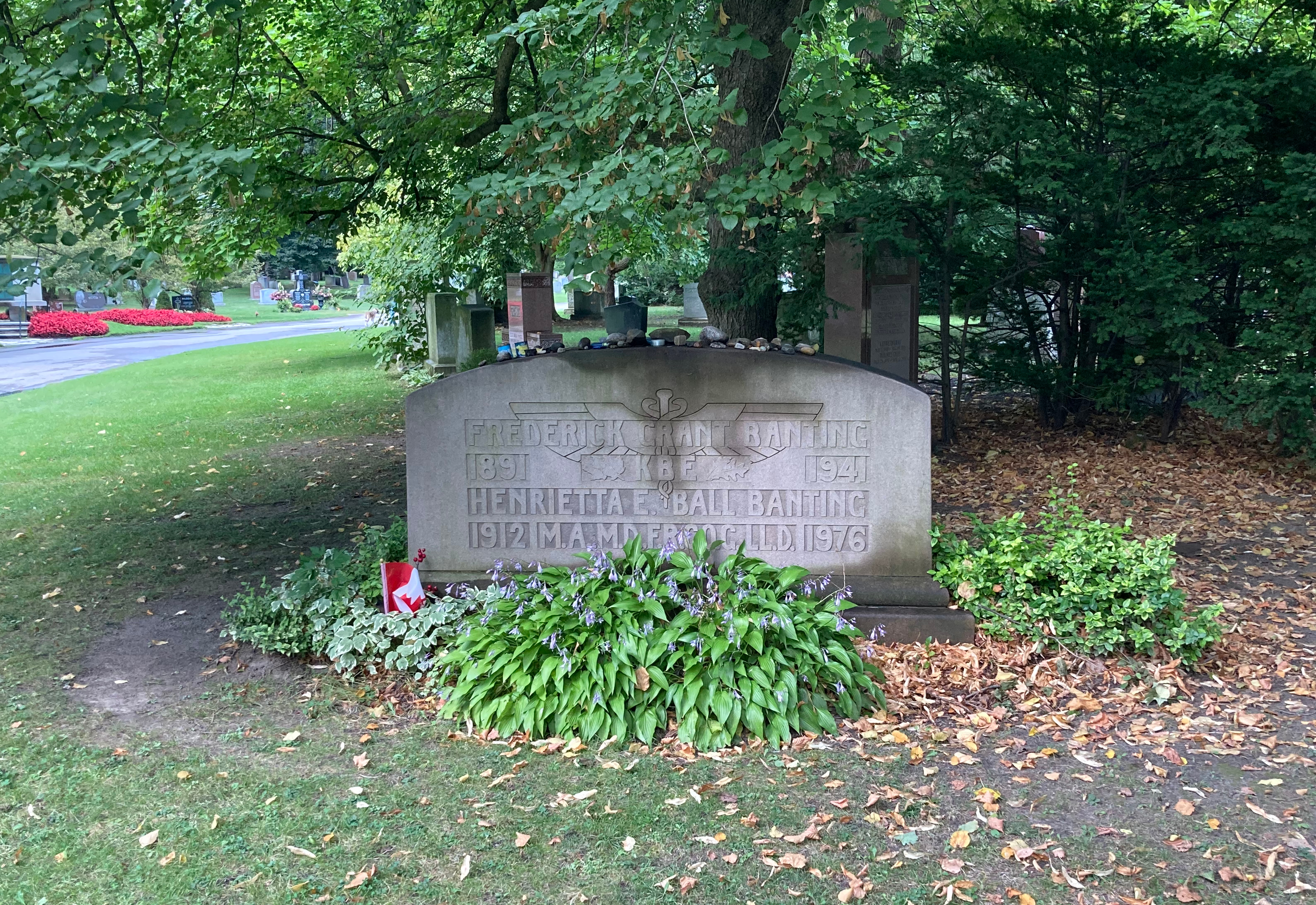
Graves of Frederick and Henrietta Banting at Mount Pleasant Cemetery. Decorations from visitors include rocks, candles, and an injector pen.

In February 1941, Banting died of wounds and exposure following the crash of a Lockheed L-14 Super Electra/Hudson in which he was a passenger, in Musgrave Harbour, Newfoundland. After departing from Gander, Newfoundland, both of the plane's engines failed. The navigator and co-pilot died instantly, but Banting and the pilot, Captain Joseph Mackey, survived the initial impact. According to Mackey, the sole survivor, Banting was well enough to provide first aid and leave the aircraft, but died from his injuries the next day. Banting was en route to England to conduct operational tests on the Franks flying suit developed by his colleague Wilbur Franks.

Banting and his wife are buried at Mount Pleasant Cemetery in Toronto.

== Legacy ==
In 1994, Banting was inducted into the Canadian Medical Hall of Fame. In 2004, he was nominated as one of the top 10 "Greatest Canadians" by viewers of the Canadian Broadcasting Corporation. When the final votes were counted, Banting finished fourth behind Tommy Douglas, Terry Fox and Pierre Trudeau.

=== Namesakes ===
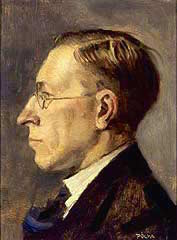
Oil painting of Banting in 1925 by Tibor Polya, now in the possession of the National Portrait Gallery of Canada

Banting's namesake, the Banting Research Foundation, was created in 1925 and provides funding to support health and biomedical research in Canada.

Banting's name is immortalized in the yearly Banting Lectures, given by an expert in diabetes, and by the creation of the Banting and Best Department of Medical Research of the University of Toronto; Sir Frederick G Banting Research Centre located on Sir Frederick Banting Driveway in the Tunney's Pasture complex, Ottawa; Banting Memorial High School in Alliston Sir Frederick Banting Secondary School in London, Ontario; Sir Frederick Banting Alternative Program Site in Ottawa; Frederick Banting Elementary School in Montréal-Nord and École Banting Middle School in Coquitlam.

The "Major Sir Frederick Banting, MC, RCAMC Award for Military Health Research", sponsored by the True Patriot Love Foundation, is awarded annually by the Surgeon General to the researcher whose work presented at the annual Military and Veterans Health Research Forum is deemed to contribute most to military health. It was first awarded in 2011 in the presence of several Banting descendants.

The "Canadian Forces Major Sir Frederick Banting Term Chair in Military Trauma Research" at Sunnybrook Health Sciences Centre was established in 2012. The first Chair holder is Colonel Homer Tien, medical director of Sunnybrook's Tory Regional Trauma Centre and Senior Specialist and Trauma Adviser to the Surgeon General.

The Banting Postdoctoral Fellowship Program is administered by the Canadian Institutes of Health Research, the Natural Sciences and Engineering Research Council of Canada, and the Social Sciences and Humanities Research Council of Canada. The fellowship provided up to two years of funding at $70,000 per year to researchers in health, natural sciences, engineering, social sciences and humanities.

=== Properties ===
Banting House, his former home located in London, Ontario, was declared a National Historic Site of Canada in 1997. The house contains a museum of the history of insulin, as well as Banting's artwork. The Banting Interpretation Centre in Musgrave Harbour, Newfoundland and Labrador is a museum named after him which focuses on the circumstances surrounding the 1941 plane crash which claimed his life. The crater Banting on the Moon is also named after him for his contributions to medicine.

During the voting for "Greatest Canadians" in late 2003, controversy rose over the future use of the Banting family farm in New Tecumseth which had been left to the Ontario Historical Society by Banting's late nephew, Edward, in 1998. The dispute centred on the future use of the 40 ha (99 acres) property and its buildings. In a year-long negotiation, assisted by a provincially appointed facilitator, the Town of New Tecumseth offered $1 million to the Ontario Historical Society (OHS). The town intended to turn the property over to the Sir Frederick Banting Legacy Foundation for preservation of the property and buildings, and the Legacy Foundation planned to erect a Camp for Diabetic Youths. The day after the November 22, 2006, deadline for the OHS to sign the agreement, the OHS announced that it had sold the property for housing development to Solmar Development for more than $2 million.

The Town of New Tecumseth announced it would designate the property under the Ontario Heritage Act. This would prevent its commercial development and obligate the owner to maintain it properly. OHS objected. The Ontario Conservation Review Board heard arguments for and against designation in September 2007 and recommended designation of the entire property in October. The Town officially passed the designation by-law on November 12, 2007.

Banting's artwork has gained attention in the art community; A painting of his called "St. Tîte des Cap" sold for Can$30,000 including buyer's premium at a Canadian art auction in Toronto.

=== Portrayals in film ===
He and his insulin discovery have also been depicted in various media formats, including comic books, a biography by Michael Bliss, and on television. The National Film Board of Canada produced a short film in 1958, The Quest. The 1988 television movie Glory Enough for All depicted the search for insulin by Banting and Best, with R. H. Thomson starring as Banting. Banting is also portrayed by Jason Priestley boarding his fatal flight in the 2006 historical drama Above and Beyond.

== Awards and honours ==
Banting and Macleod's 1923 Nobel Prize for Physiology or Medicine (Diploma): "for the discovery of insulin"

- 1923: Nobel Prize in Physiology or Medicine for the discovery of insulin – shared with John Macleod
- 1923: John Scott Medal of the Franklin Institute
- 1927: Cameron Prize for Therapeutics of the University of Edinburgh
- 1931: Flavelle Medal of the Royal Society of Canada
- 1935: Fellowship of the Royal Society

Prior to the award of the Nobel Prize in Physiology or Medicine for 1923—which he shared with Macleod—he received the Reeve Prize of the University of Toronto (1922). In 1923, the Canadian Parliament granted him a Life Annuity of $7,500. Following the Banting's receipt of the Cameron Prize for Therapeutics of the University of Edinburgh in 1927, Banting gave the 1928 Cameron Lecture in Edinburgh. He was a member of numerous medical academies and societies in Canada and abroad, including the British and American Physiological Societies, and the American Pharmacological Society. In 1934, he was knighted as a Knight Commander of the Order of the British Empire (KBE) by King George V and became an active vice-president of the Diabetic Association (now Diabetes UK). In May 1935 he was elected a Fellow of the Royal Society. In 2004, Banting was inducted into the National Inventors Hall of Fame.

=== Flame of Hope ===
A "Flame of Hope" was lit by Her Majesty Queen Elizabeth the Queen Mother in 1989 as a tribute to Dr. Frederick Grant Banting and all the people that have lost their lives to diabetes. The flame will remain lit until there is a cure for diabetes. When a cure is found, the flame will be extinguished by the researchers who discover the cure. The flame is located at Sir Frederick Banting Square in London, Ontario, Canada beside the Banting House National Historic Site of Canada.

=== Time capsule ===
A time capsule was buried in the Sir Frederick Banting Square in 1991 to honour the 100th anniversary of Sir Frederick Banting's birth. It was buried by the International Diabetes Federation youth representatives and Governor General of Canada Ray Hnatyshyn. It will be exhumed if a cure for diabetes is found.

=== Honorary degrees ===
Sir Frederick Banting received honorary degrees from several universities:

- University of Western Ontario (LL.D.) on May 30, 1924
- University of Toronto (D.Sc.) in 1924
- Queen's University (LL.D.) in 1924
- University of Michigan (LL.D.) in 1924
- Yale University (D.Sc.) in 1924
- University of the State of New York (D.Sc.) in 1931
- McGill University (D.Sc.) in 1939

=== Honorific eponyms ===
Events

- Banting Lectures, annual lecture series organized by the American Diabetes Association
- Banting Award, highly prestigious award for the best researchers in Canada, valued at $70,000 per year.

Schools

- Ontario: Banting and Best Public School, Toronto
- Ontario: Banting Memorial High School, Alliston
- Ontario: Sir Frederick Banting Secondary School, London
- British Columbia: École Banting Middle School, Coquitlam

== Tribute ==
Since 1941, the American Diabetes Association confers Banting Medals for those with long-term contribution to diabetes research and treatment. In 1991, International Diabetes Federation and World Health Organization (WHO) made his birthday the World Diabetes Day. On November 14, 2016, Google celebrated his 125th birthday with a Google Doodle. 2021 marks the centenary of Dr. Banting's co-discovery of insulin at the University of Toronto. Canada Post issued a commemorative stamp.

Awards and achievements
Preceded by Earl of Birkenhead	Cover of Time magazine August 27, 1923	Succeeded by David Lloyd George
