= Mount Sinai Hospital (Minneapolis) =

Geography
- Location: Minneapolis, Minnesota, United States

Organization
- Type: Teaching
- Religious affiliation: Judaism
- Affiliated university: University of Minnesota Medical School and the Minneapolis General Hospital

Services
- Beds: 197

History
- Opened: February 19, 1951
- Closed: 1991

Links
- Lists: Hospitals in Minnesota

Mount Sinai Hospital, located in Minneapolis, Minnesota, was the first non-sectarian hospital in the state. Opened in 1951 in South Minneapolis on Chicago Avenue between East 22nd Street and 24th Street, the hospital eventually merged with Metropolitan Medical Center to become Metropolitan-Mt. Sinai before dissolving in 1991.

== Early history ==
After World War II, the idea for a Jewish hospital began circulating as Jewish community members expressed the desire for a hospital in the Twin Cities that would admit minorities on its staff. Surveys conducted in 1945 and 1947 showed that Jewish doctors faced discrimination and were routinely excluded from medical school faculties and private hospital staffs. Dr. Moses Barron, along with other Jewish community leaders including philanthropist Jay Phillips, began fundraising for the hospital in 1945. By 1946 the hospital site was chosen in South Minneapolis and architects Liebenberg and Kaplan were hired. By 1947, more than $1.75 million had been raised.

On February 19, 1951, Mount Sinai Hospital finally opened its doors under Chief of Staff Dr. Moses Barron. The seven-story, 197 bed facility was the most modern hospital in the community at the time. Its creation served two purposes: Jewish physicians who had been denied admitting privileges at other city hospitals could now practice medicine, and the founders garnered enormous civic prestige. It was the first private non-sectarian hospital in the community to accept members of minority races on its medical staff. After time, the University of Minnesota Medical School and the Minneapolis General Hospital came to Mount Sinai for instruction, and Mount Sinai established a formal residency teaching program, becoming only one of three privately supported medical institutions in the state of Minnesota to provide graduate level medical education.

The Auxiliary group, which formed in 1950 and was composed mainly of women as a counterbalance to the majority male staff, became instrumental in fundraising for the hospital with annual fundraisers, charity balls, and even staffing the hospital coffee shop. By 1987 the Auxiliary group had a membership of 2,200; over their 41-year history they helped to raise over one million dollars for the hospital.

== Closing ==
In 1990, Mount Sinai Hospital merged with Metropolitan Medical Center to become Metropolitan-Mount Sinai. The hospital could not survive after the merger and in 1991 they closed their doors. The Hennepin County Medical Center, which was adjacent to the hospital, then expanded with the closure of Metropolitan-Mount Sinai. The Mount Sinai Auxiliary continued, transforming into the Mount Sinai Community Foundation, a group that still provides funds within the community to programs that support health and wellness in the Twin Cities.
