= Linné (crater) =

Crater on the Moon

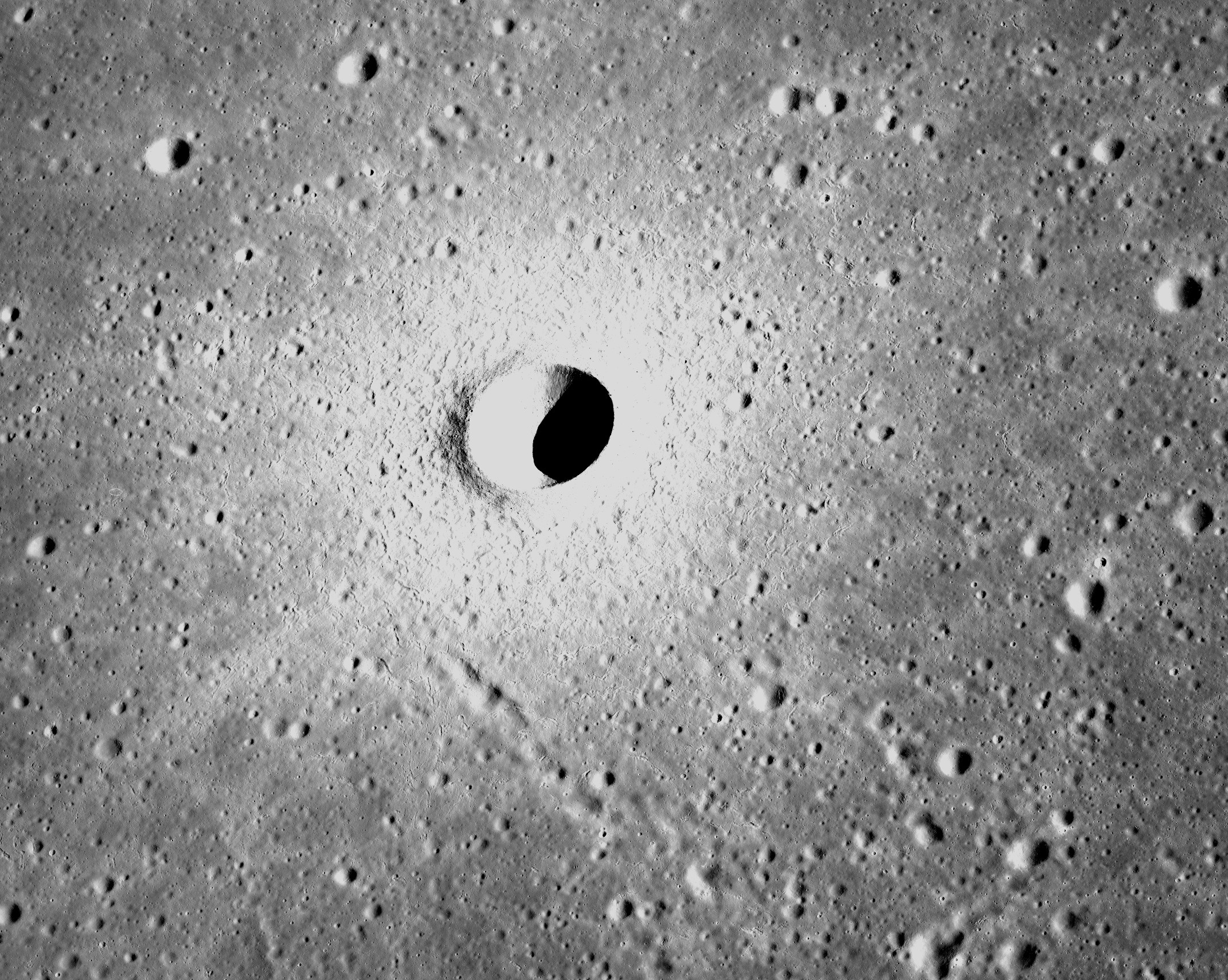
- Lunar crater Linné from Apollo 15. NASA photo.
- Coordinates: 27.7°N 11.8°E
- Diameter: 2.4 km (1.5 miles)
- Depth: 0.6 km (0.3 miles)
- Colongitude: 348° at sunrise
- Formation: Copernican
- Eponym: Carl Linnaeus

Linné is a small lunar impact crater located in the western Mare Serenitatis. It was named after Swedish botanist Carl Linnaeus. The mare around this feature is virtually devoid of other features of interest. The nearest named crater is Banting to the east-southeast. The estimated age of this copernican crater is only a few tens of millions of years. It was earlier believed to have a bowl shape, but data from the LRO showed that it has a shape of a flattened, inverted cone. The crater is surrounded by a blanket of ejecta formed during the original impact. This ejecta has a relatively high albedo, making the feature appear bright.

Learn what LRO has learned about Linne Crater in this video.

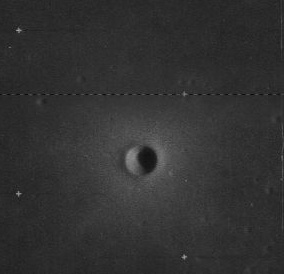
Lunar Orbiter 4 image

In 1824 Wilhelm Lohrmann (1786-1840) of Dresden had drawn Linné as an 8 km diameter crater in his acclaimed lunar atlas, and in 1837 Wilhelm Beer and Johann Heinrich Mädler had described Linne in Der Mond as a 10 km crater. In 1866, the experienced lunar observer and mapmaker Johann Friedrich Julius Schmidt made the surprising claim that Linné had changed its appearance. Instead of a normal, somewhat deep crater it had become a mere white patch. A controversy arose that continued for many decades. However, this crater size tests the limit of visual perception of Earth-based telescopes. In conditions of poor visibility this feature can appear to vanish from sight (see also transient lunar phenomenon).

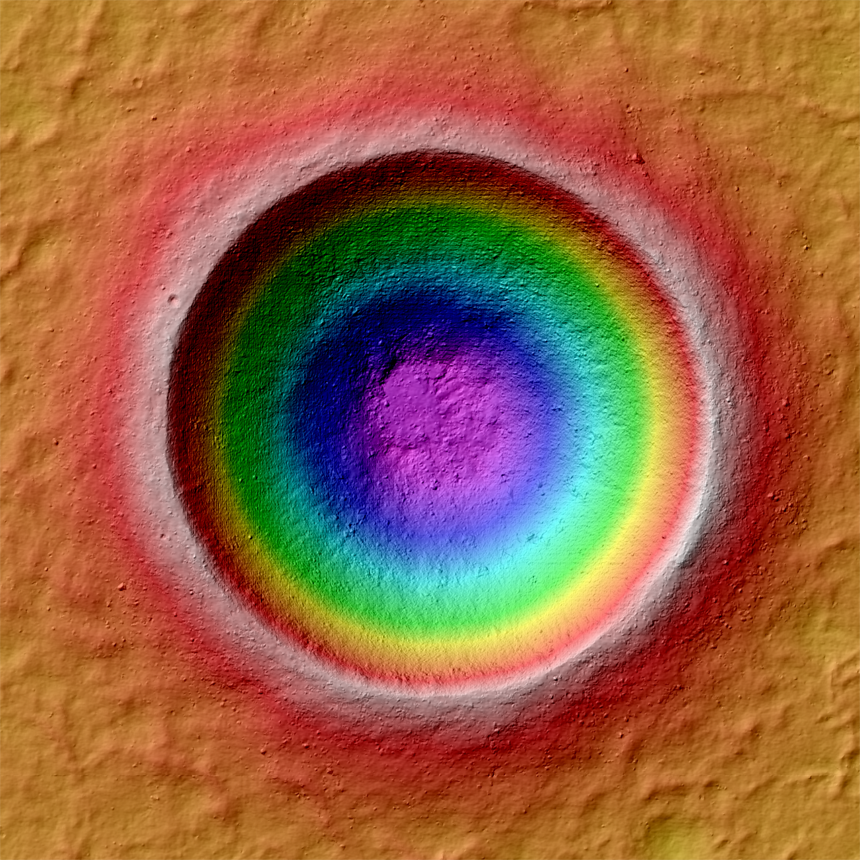
Color coded shaded relief map of Linné crater

== Satellite craters ==
By convention these features are identified on lunar maps by placing the letter on the side of the crater midpoint that is closest to Linné.

Linné	Latitude	Longitude	Diameter
A	28.9° N	14.4° E	4 km
B	30.5° N	14.2° E	5 km
D	28.7° N	17.1° E	5 km
F	32.3° N	13.9° E	5 km
G	35.9° N	13.3° E	5 km
H	33.7° N	13.8° E	3 km

The following craters have been renamed by the IAU.

- Linné E — See Banting (crater).
