= Henrietta Banting =

Canadian physician

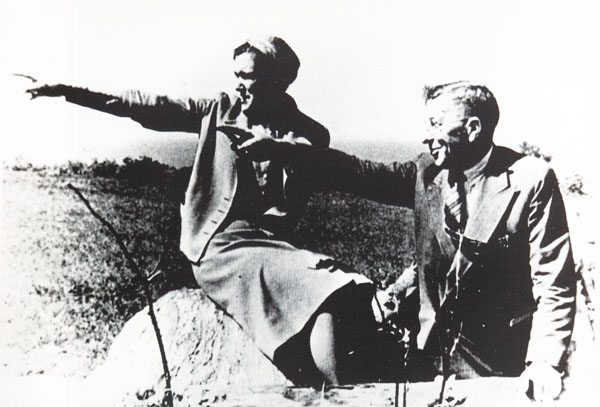
- Born: March 4, 1912; Stanstead, Quebec, Canada
- Died: July 26, 1976 (aged 64)
- Burial place: Mount Pleasant Cemetery
- Education: Mount Allison University (BA); University of Toronto (MA, MD)
- Occupations: Physician; scientist
- Years active: 1945–1971
- Employer(s): Royal Canadian Army Medical Corps, University of Hong Kong, Women's College Hospital
- Spouse: Frederick Banting (m. 1937)

Henrietta Elizabeth Banting or "Lady Banting" (March 4, 1912 – July 26, 1976) was a Canadian physician and the second wife of Sir Frederick Banting, who was awarded the Nobel Prize for his co-discovery of insulin and its therapeutic potential. Banting was the Director of Women's College Hospital's Cancer Detection Clinic from 1958-1971. While working at the Cancer Detection Clinic, she conducted a research study on mammography to measure its effectiveness as a diagnostic tool for breast cancer.

== Early life and education ==
Henrietta Elizabeth Ball was born on March 4, 1912, in Stanstead, Quebec. She later enrolled in Mount Allison University and graduated in 1932 with a BA in Biology. After her graduation she spent several years in New Brunswick conducting clinical laboratory work in various hospitals. She then moved to Toronto to attend the University of Toronto's Banting Institute, earning a master's degree in Medical Research in 1937. It was during her time at the Banting Institute that she met Sir Frederick Banting, whom she married in 1939. In 1941, Henrietta Banting enrolled in the University of Toronto's medical school where she obtained her MD in 1945. During her time in medical school she was also simultaneously enlisted in the Royal Canadian Army Medical Corps.

Following her graduation, Banting travelled to London to complete postgraduate training in obstetrics and gynaecology. During that time she also became a member of the Royal College of Obstetricians and Gynaecologists. Banting then travelled to Hong Kong to work as a lecturer in the University of Hong Kong's medical school. In 1951, she travelled back to Canada.

== Career ==
Shortly after returning to Toronto, Banting established her own private practice. She was hired to the staff of Women's College Hospital in 1957 and became the Director of its Cancer Detection Clinic in 1958. One of this clinic's most notable endeavours was a research study, led by Banting and Elizabeth Forbes (Chief of Radiology at Women's College Hospital), which investigated "the effectiveness of mammography as a diagnostic tool for the early detection of breast cancer." This study compared the effectiveness of mammograms and physical examinations in detecting breast cancer in 1,436 patients– eventually concluding that "a combined approach" provided the best results. This study was published in 1967 in the Journal of the Canadian Association of Radiologists. This study was recognized as one of the first Canadian papers on mammography. Furthermore, because of this study, Women's College Hospital became the first hospital to use mammography as a routine screening tool for breast cancer in Ontario.

== Personal life ==
Henrietta married Sir Frederick Banting in 1937 and became known as Lady Banting. Sir Frederick Banting died "while on active duty with the Canadian military in 1941".

According to a biography, her hobbies included: gardening, antique furniture and interior decorating.

== Retirement and legacy ==
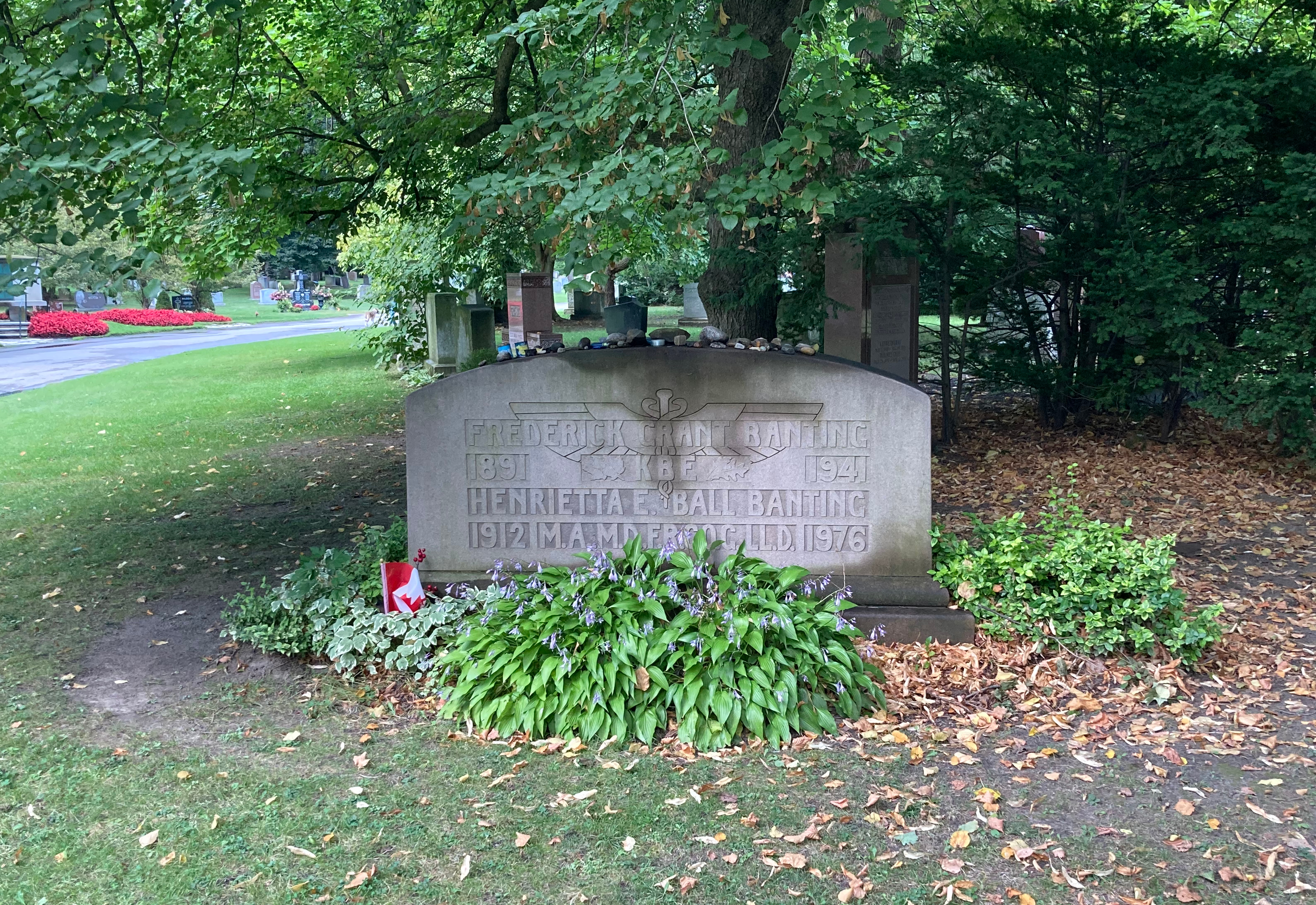
Graves of Frederick and Henrietta Banting at Mount Pleasant Cemetery

Banting retired as the Director of the Cancer Detection Clinic in 1971. She died on July 26, 1976, and was buried with Frederick at Mount Pleasant Cemetery. In honour of her memory the hospital established the Henrietta Banting Breast Centre. The Henrietta Banting Memorial Fund was also established to support "a lectureship and project related to the Henrietta Banting Breast Centre at WCH and to obstetrics, gynaecology and neonatology, also interests of Banting".

== Memberships ==
Banting was a member of several organizations, including: The Medical Women's International Association where she was the vice president and the Canadian Cancer Society where she was "the first Chairman of the National Service to Patients Committee".
