= Banting Postdoctoral Fellowship =

Canadian federal postdoctoral fellowship program

Banting Postdoctoral Fellowships
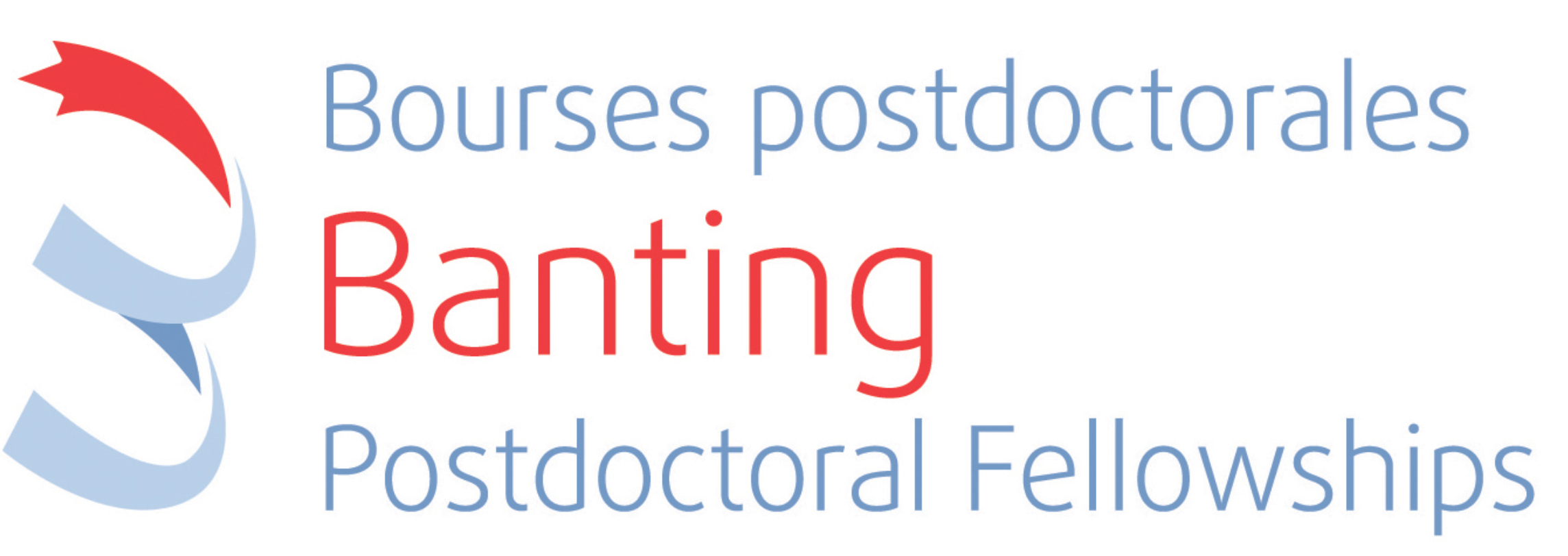
- Country: Canada
- Presented by: Government of Canada
- Established: 2010
- Website: https://banting.fellowships-bourses.gc.ca/en/home-accueil.html

The Banting Postdoctoral Fellowships program was a Canadian federal research fellowship established in 2010 and administered by the Government of Canada. The program provided competitive funding to postdoctoral researchers from Canada and abroad and formed part of the national tri-agency research training framework. It was named in honour of Sir Frederick Grant Banting, the Canadian physician-scientist who co-discovered insulin and received the 1923 Nobel Prize in Physiology or Medicine.

The fellowship was jointly administered by the Canadian Institutes of Health Research (CIHR), the Natural Sciences and Engineering Research Council (NSERC), and the Social Sciences and Humanities Research Council (SSHRC). The final competition was launched in 2024, after which the program was discontinued as part of a restructuring of federal postdoctoral research training programs.

== History ==
The Banting Postdoctoral Fellowships were announced in the Government of Canada’s 2010 federal budget as a nationally competitive fellowship program intended to strengthen Canada’s ability to attract and retain highly qualified postdoctoral researchers. The program was positioned as the postdoctoral-level counterpart to the Vanier Canada Graduate Scholarships and aligned with broader federal strategies to enhance research excellence and leadership development.

Up to 70 fellowships were awarded annually across the health sciences, natural sciences and engineering, and the social sciences and humanities. Award recipients were selected through a centralized tri-agency peer-review process.

In 2024, the federal research councils confirmed that the 2024–25 cycle would be the final Banting competition. The program was subsequently replaced by a harmonized postdoctoral funding model under the Tri-Agency Training Strategy.

== Objectives ==
The stated objectives of the Banting Postdoctoral Fellowships were to:

- attract and retain high-calibre postdoctoral researchers in Canada;
- support the development of leadership potential among emerging researchers; and
- facilitate the transition of fellows into research-intensive careers in academia, industry, and the public sector.

A defining feature of the program was its emphasis on alignment between the applicant’s proposed research program and the strategic priorities and research environment of the host institution.

== Funding and duration ==
The fellowship provided:

- $70,000 CAD per year (taxable); and
- a two-year, non-renewable tenure.

Fellows were expected to devote the majority of their time to research activities during the award period. Fellowships were administered through CIHR, NSERC, or SSHRC depending on the disciplinary focus of the proposed research.

== Eligibility ==
Eligibility requirements included:

- completion of a PhD, PhD-equivalent, or eligible health professional degree within a defined time window;
- formal endorsement by a Canadian host institution; and
- compliance with citizenship and residency criteria permitting applications from Canadian citizens, permanent residents, and international applicants.

International award holders were required to undertake their fellowship at a Canadian institution.

== Selection process ==
Applications were assessed through a competitive tri-agency peer-review process that evaluated:

- research excellence and leadership potential;
- quality and feasibility of the proposed research program;
- strength of institutional support and research environment; and
- anticipated long-term impact within the applicant’s field.

Review panels were composed of subject-matter experts drawn from across Canada.

== Program impact ==
From 2010 until its conclusion, the Banting Postdoctoral Fellowships supported several hundred postdoctoral researchers across a wide range of disciplines. Government evaluations reported that a substantial proportion of fellowship recipients progressed to research-intensive careers and contributed to Canada’s research output and international visibility. These evaluations also identified programmatic limitations, including application complexity and challenges related to international recruitment.

== Program discontinuation ==
The Banting Postdoctoral Fellowships concluded following the 2024–25 competition cycle. The program’s discontinuation reflected a federal policy shift toward a consolidated and harmonized tri-agency framework for postdoctoral research training and funding.

== See also ==
- Vanier Canada Graduate Scholarships
