= Thorburn Brailsford Robertson =

Australian physiologist, biochemist, gerontologist, and animal nutritionist

Senior Houseman
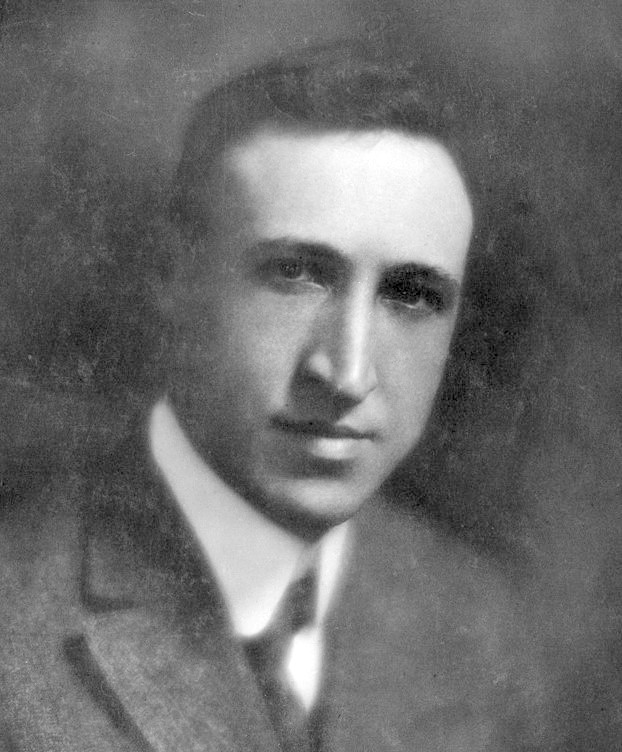
- Brailsford Robertson, at Toronto (1919)
- Born: 4 March 1884; Edinburgh, Scotland
- Died: 18 January 1930 (aged 45); Warringa Private Hospital, Glenelg, South Australia
- Education: University of Adelaide; University of California
- Known for: patenting "tethelin"; assigning the "tethelin" patent to University of California; improving the production and clinical use of insulin to treat diabetes mellitus; animal nutrition
- Spouse: Jane Winifred Stirling (m.1910)
- Children: 3
- Relatives: Sir Edward Stirling (father-in-law)
- Scientific career
- Workplaces: University of California; University of Toronto; University of Adelaide
- Academic advisors: Jacques Loeb
- Doctoral students: Roy Elwood Clausen, Selman Waksman

Thorburn Brailsford Robertson (4 March 1884 – 18 January 1930), generally known as Brailsford Robertson, was an Australian academic, physiologist, biochemist, gerontologist, and animal nutritionist. Driven by his view, "Do the best you can with what you have where you are", he was "widely regarded as having possessed a rare capacity both as a teacher and researcher". Robertson's assignment of the rights to his tethelin patent (BR.20, BR.21) to the University of California (UC.7) in September 1917 is universally treated as a landmark precedent event in the subsequent development of what is now known as university technology transfer.

His initial research interests were in the physical and biochemical processes underlying nervous activity, cognition, human growth, and senescence.

Following the Canadian discovery of insulin, he became deeply involved in both researching the insulin treatment of diabetes mellitus and the Australian production of insulin, which he undertook (in mid-1922) with the direct permission (and precise details of its mode of production) of the Head of the Physiology Department of the University of Toronto, John Macleod, Robertson's former assistant at Toronto, centred on the campus of the University of Adelaide: not only refining and purifying its extraction from bovine pancreases, but also significantly reducing its cost per dose, prior to its full-scale commercial production being transferred to the Commonwealth Serum Laboratories on 1 May 1924.

Due to his later work as the inaugural Chief of the Commonwealth Government's Council for Scientific and Industrial Research (CSIR) Division of Animal Nutrition, he became one of the foremost authorities in the field of animal nutrition.

== Family ==
The only child of Thorburn Robertson (1851–1932), and Sarah Ann Robertson (1859-?), née Brailsford, Thorburn Brailsford Robertson was born at Edinburgh, Scotland on 4 March 1884. In the early 1890s he migrated to South Australia with his mother to join his father who was attorney for Kangarilla Silver Mines Ltd, and the manager of its copper mine at Callington, near Murray Bridge, South Australia. The Robertsons lived at Callington for a number of years.

=== Marriage ===
He married Jane Winifred "Jennie" Stirling (1881–1966), the third daughter of his former professor, Sir Edward Stirling, at Mount Lofty, South Australia on 1 July 1910. They had three children: Judith Stirling Robertson (1917–2012), later, Mrs. Herbert Charles Vaughan Woollard, the physicist and amateur radio operator, David Stirling Robertson, B.Sc., M.Sc., Ph.D., D.Sc. (1920–1999), and the medical practitioner, Thorburn Stirling Brailsford Robertson, M.B. B.S. (1925–1966), known as "Stirling".

== Education ==
Once the family had moved to Adelaide, he attended the Misses Stanton School, "Blanche Villa", in Glenelg (initially a girls school, later a school for boys to age 12). Robertson was educated there and continued to board with Phoebe Stanton until he graduated from university in 1905.

He enrolled in the University of Adelaide in 1902 and studied with Professor (Sir) Edward Stirling and Professor (Sir) William Bragg (Nobel Prize in Physics 1915). He graduated, aged 21, Bachelor of Science (B.Sc. with First Class Honours in Physiology) on 17 April 1905, having had two articles (BR.1, BR.2) published before he graduated. He gained his Doctor of Philosophy (Ph.D.) from the University of California, Berkeley, aged 23, in 1907. He graduated Doctor of Science (D.Sc.), in absentia, aged 24, at the University of Adelaide, on 16 December 1908.

== University of California ==
Upon graduating B.Sc. from Adelaide in 1905, he accepted the physiologist and cell biologist Jacques Loeb's offer of a (paid) junior position in the Physiology Department of the University of California's School of Medicine; and, according to Hedley Marston, as well as "enjoy[ing] the intellectual companionship and friendship of Jacques Loeb" at Berkeley, he also enjoyed "the pleasant and inspiring association of his colleagues": who included Winthrop J. V. Osterhout, Hardolph Wasteneys, Frederick P. Gay, Wolfgang Ostwald, Carl L. A. Schmidt, and Alonzo E. Taylor.

With his developing interest in physical chemistry, and his Bragg-generated interest in mathematics, he produced two papers in 1908 (BR.7, BR.8), offering "[an] extrapolation of ... [his own] mathematical models for cell growth ... to theories to account for the normal rate of growth of individual organisms". While working with Loeb at Berkeley Robertson became interested in the physical chemistry of proteins; and, in 1912, he published a monograph on the subject (BR.11), in German. It was translated into Russian, by V. M. Arkhangeleski of the University of Moscow, in 1913; and an expanded English version of the original monograph was published five years later, in 1918 (BR.34).

Robertson and his wife in the laboratory of the Physiology Department at the University of California, Berkeley, 1912.

In 1910, when Loeb moved to The Rockefeller Institute for Medical Research in New York, Robertson was promoted to Associate Professor of Physiological Chemistry within the School of Medicine; and, in 1916, he was appointed as full Professor of Biochemistry in the new, separate, Department of Biochemistry and Pharmacology that had just been established in the university's School of Medicine. By this time, through his "investigat[ions of the] diverse aspects of mechanisms of growth and longevity in plants, animals and humans", Robertson had already "gained international repute as a leader in the field of biochemistry".

=== Sabbatical leave (1913/1914) ===
In 1913/1914 Robertson took 12 months sabbatical leave from the University of California. He spent four months in Adelaide, during which time he delivered two lectures: "Some Factors in the Cell Growth of Tumors [sic]", to the Microscopical Society of South Australia on 22 July 1913, and "Some Economic Aspects of Scientific Research", to the Science Association of the Adelaide University on 6 August 1913.

On 12 November 1913, he submitted a 17-page report, Report on the Scope and Administration of an Institute for Scientific Research in Australia (BR.15), to the South Australian branch of the British Science Guild. The Guild's Report, with Robertson's report appended to it, was immediately given to Patrick "Paddy" McMahon Glynn, the Member for Angas, and Minister for Foreign Affairs, for him to directly hand it on to the Prime Minister, Joseph Cook. According to George Currie and John Graham (GC.1, pp.8–9), there is no evidence that Robertson's (1913) report ever reached the Prime Minister (or any other Minister) at that time.

Robertson then travelled widely throughout Europe. In March 1914 he met up with Ivan Pavlov in Russia, and Pavlov gave him a personal tour of his laboratories at the Institute of Experimental Medicine in Saint Petersburg.

=== Doctoral students ===
His doctoral students at the University of California included Roy Elwood Clausen, Carl L. A. Schmidt, and Selman Waksman (the 1952 Nobel Prize in Physiology or Medicine for the discovery of streptomycin).

Tethelin.

"Tests of this new chemical substance made in army hospitals in Europe and in civil hospitals in America have shown that it is of value in curing wounds and in causing wounds to heal promptly which for months or even years had refused to yield to treatment. While several new substances and new methods found by medical investigators since the war began have proved extremely useful in combating infections in wounds, 'Tethelin' has a field of usefulness all its own — after other methods have rendered the tissues aseptic and wounds sometimes refuse to heal, especially where frostbite, burns, or varicose veins have injured the vitality of the tissues. There are thousands of such cases in Europe to-day and they occupy the hospitals for an exceptionally long time, consuming drugs, time, space, and food, and frequently such cases have to be discharged unhealed. It is precisely these cases — the most expensive and most disabling type of wounds — which 'Tethelin' aids, since it stimulates the sluggish tissues and enables nature to work its own repair." Science, 12 October 1917.

== Tethelin (Roberson's patent and trade-mark) ==
In March 1916, Robertson published a suite of five interconnected articles in the Journal of Biological Chemistry, describing the process through which a material, which he called tethelin (from τεθηλώς, 'growing'), he and his assistant Louis Adolph Ray (1886-1960) had extracted (in 1915) from the anterior lobes of ox pituitaries acquired from a local slaughterhouse (BR.24), and its positive effects on the growth of his experimental mice (BR.25–BR.28). Robertson claimed that the substance was the pituitary's "growth-controlling principle"; and, according to Robertson's account, on-going research demonstrated that tethelin not only controlled growth, but was very effective in the treatment of ulcers of long standing and slow-healing wounds.

Prior to the (March 1916) publication of his discoveries, Robertson had not only been granted the US patent (BR.20) and the UK patent (BR.21) for the "Tethelin" extraction process, but had also begun to use the trade-mark TETHELIN, the rights to which he was subsequently granted in December 1916 (BR.23). Well aware of Jokichi Takamine's earlier struggle to patent adrenalin, and the challenges and time delays Takamine experienced, Robertson had simply patented his process, and not his product.

=== Controversies and precedents ===
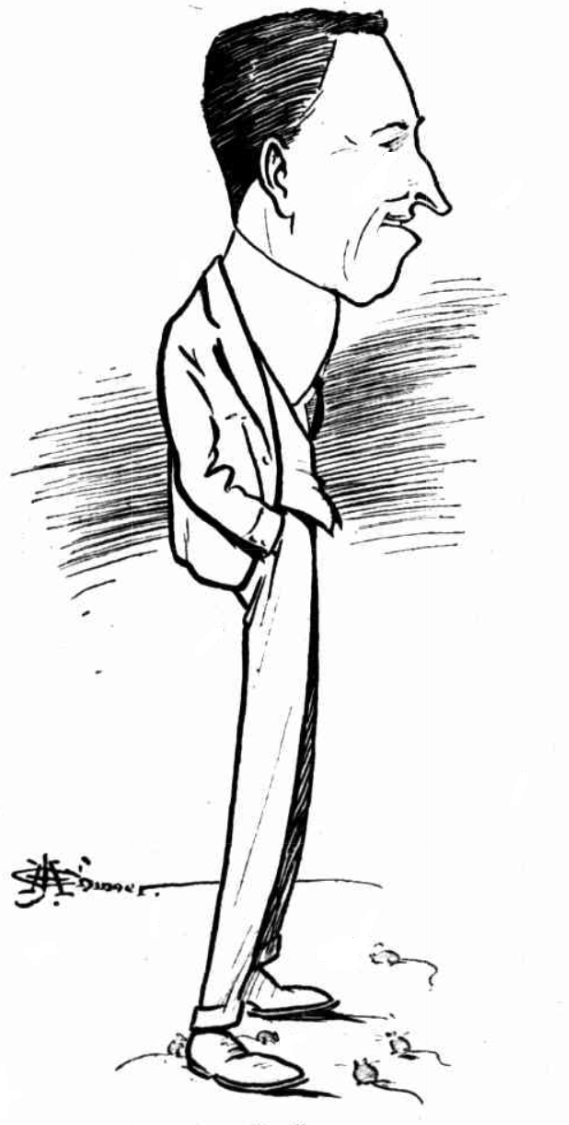
"Robertson was a tall, popular man who who, despite his drive and leadership was gentle, tolerant and understanding of colleagues." (DB.3).

- Long before the born secret issues associated with the restricted data provisions of the US Atomic Energy Act of 1946, the US Invention Secrecy Act of 1951, and the US Patent and Trademark Law Amendments Act of 1980 and/or the increasing concerns with respect to the on-going biopiracy of natural products, and in the early 20th-century atmosphere of cultural change — not only in the proliferation of vocational universities, rather than research universities, but also in the gradual move from the disciplinary concentration on "pure science" and, perhaps, aspects of "applied science", to that of fostering "industrial science" in both primary and secondary industries — the ethical question of whether or not those universities devoted to "pure science" (viz., the discovery/creation, distillation, refinement, diffusion, and the free dissemination of knowledge for the benefit of the public) should have any interest in "applied science", and further, whether they should have any commercial interest in the products of their research and, in particular, whether they should seek patents for their discoveries.
  - In his 1926 Presidential address to the Society of American Bacteriologists (HZ.1), Hans Zinsser spoke against "the growing tendency on the part of medical scientific workers, and bacteriologists especially, to patent discoveries of practical therapeutic and public health value" (p.157). From Zunsser's view that "one cannot practice a profession like a trade" (p.157), he observed that, for instance, "an improvement in the mechanism of an automobile, or of a shoe buckle" — which were "matters of convenience or luxury", and therefore, "[could] be dispensed with easily by those who are forced to do without them" — were in an entirely "different category" from matters concerning "the relief of the sick and the prevention of unnecessary sorrow by the maintenance of individual and public health" which, "as soon as we are in possession of the knowledge of principles or methods which can contribute to these purposes their free utilization becomes a public necessity"; and, from this, he argued that "there is no valid argument in favor of the patenting of a useful method of preserving health, private or public, unless we admit [which Zinsser did not] that medical discoveries in no ethical sense differ from the purely commercial ones" (p.161).
- In addition to the question of whether it was ethical to patent medical inventions (pharmaceuticals, devices, apparatus, procedures, etc.), or not — in particular, whether "products of scientific research that affect public and individual health, particularly discoveries and inventions of a medical, pharmaceutical, therapeutic, or hygienic nature ... both patentable and otherwise, should be shared 'without fee or stipulation'", or, given the "[difference] between patenting for personal gain and patenting in the public interest" whether "a new process or discovery [should be patented] in the public interest" — the medical profession had a further concern. The term, "patented medicine" strongly suggested the unscientific, testimonial-promoted, "cure all" preparation of the charlatan, quack, or snake oil salesman, universally known as a patent medicine.
- In 1911, the "free use" of more than 90% of the 250 patents that had been issued by the Patent Office to government employees had been given over, by those patentees, to "the government and the people of the United States". Given that, if the invention was "of any value", and the employee had not patented it, "there is the chance at any time that somebody else may take out the patent and collect royalties from the public", patenting was "for the protection of the public rather than for the protection of the patentee" and, in doing so, also "prevent[ed] some more mercenary individual from collecting royalties".
- In 1907, Frederick Cottrell, a colleague of Robertson's at the University of California, patented his electrostatic precipitator, designed to produce cleaner industrial chimney emissions (FC.1), and offered the rights to the University. From their view that the university's Charter precluded any commercial activity, the Regents of the University of California declined Cottrell's offer. In response, Cottrell went on to establish an independent nonprofit organization on 26 February 1912 — the Research Corporation for Science Advancement — not only to manage his own patents, but to "contract with various universities, industry workers, and unattached inventors in order to manage their patents", with the profits used to fund research, regardless of the applicant's university.
  - In 1925, Harry Steenbock, a professor of biochemistry at the University of Wisconsin–Madison, offered to assign his thyroxine patent rights (HS.1) to the university. The university's Regents declined Steenbock's offer. In response, the Wisconsin Alumni Research Foundation (WARF), an independent University technology transfer office, was created to manage Steenbok's patent; and, by 2023, WARF had gone on to manage more than 4,200 patents (with 2,200 patents still active).
- For Robertson, the need for appropriate buildings, laboratories, supplies, and equipment to be funded for research was always at least as important as the funding of any individual researcher.
- In 1917, in a precedent-setting action, Robertson proposed assigning his patent rights to the University of California (EN.1; SC.1) (i.e., rather than Cottrell's non-specific Research Corporation) specifically to support medical research at the University of California. With the Regents of the University of California still holding their (earlier) view that their university's Charter precluded any commercial activity, the Regents and Robertson eventually came to the extraordinary (at the time) arrangement (UC.6) of creating an external-to-the-university entity to manage the patent and "apply any unexpended balance of such proceeds, profits or returns to research work in Medicine and preferably in the Physiology, Chemistry and Pathology of Growth either under the auspices of the University of California or otherwise ... [or] such research work be conducted in part in Australia, either under the auspices of some institution of learning there or otherwise".
- Robertson and five others from the University of California formed the entity's first Board of Directors: Herbert McLean Evans (Professor of Anatomy), Frederick Parker Gay (Professor of Pathology), T. Brailsford Robertson (Professor of Biochemistry and Pharmacology), Carl Louis August Schmidt (Research Assistant in Pathology), and George Hoyt Whipple (Director of the Hooper Foundation for Medical Research and Professor of Research Medicine); and, once the Board of Directors had been appointed, the university granted a five year exclusive license in September 1917 to the H. K. Mulford Company "to manufacture and sell the compound known as Tethelin at its factory in the City of Philadelphia, State of Pennsylvania".
  - "In 1923, by the end of Mulford's five-year contract, the university's royalties on sales of tethelin amounted to only $272.47" (CW.1, p. 35).

=== University technology transfer ===
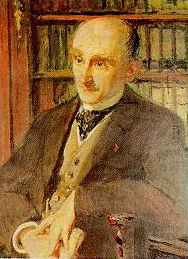
Henri Bergson (1891).

Despite the ethical, academic, commercial, and therapeutic controversies surrounding the identity and efficacy of "tethelin" itself (see below), Robertson's (1917) assignment of his tethelin patent to the University of California is universally treated as a landmark precedent event in the development of university technology transfer. In the ensuing years, the emergence of the concept of "intellectual property", driven by the theories and influence of Henri Bergson (the (August 1922) inaugural chairman of the League of Nations Committee on Intellectual Cooperation), made the already complex "paper vs. patent" issue even more fiercely contested, due to the significantly increased number of patents and the number of universities involved, and the extent to which a university's ever-increasing move towards commercialization not only reduced that institution's focus on the production of knowledge, but also privatised the knowledge that its researchers produced (PS.1):

- In his (August 1962) Report to the National Research Council of the National Academy of Sciences (AP.2), Archie Palmer reported that, of the 945 US "higher education institutions" he had surveyed, 349 had either "formulated and adopted a formalized research and patent policy", or were observing "a generally accepted practice with respect to the handling of research and patent matters", whilst the remaining 596 (which, he observed, conducted "little or no scientific or technological research") had "no formalized research or patent policies".
- In 1965, 96 US patents were granted to 28 "US universities or related institutions"; in 1992, 1500 US patents were granted to more than 150 "US universities or related institutions" (RH.2, p. 119).
- In 2025, the (formerly reluctant) University of California had been granted 571 patents, making the university's total "over 6,800 active patents" (JB.2).
- According to the economists Stanley Engerman and Gavin Wright (SE.1),
  (a) until 1933 there were more US patents issued to individuals than those issued to corporations,
  (b) by 1950 the ratio was 50:50,
  (c) by 1998, whilst the number of US patents issued to individual inventors remained more or less the same, (i.e., 10,000–15,000 per annum), they only represented approx. 10% of the number of patents issued.
Tethelin (rejected as "remedy").

"In 1916, T. Brailsford Robertson announced the isolation from the anterior lobe of the pituitary gland of cattle of a product or principal [sic'] which affected favorably the growth of animals. Robertson named this product Tethelin. He patented his discovery and assigned the patent to the University of California. The university in turn, licensed the H. K. Mulford Co. to manufacture and market the preparation. In consideration of the claim that Tethelin might be used to accelerate growth and that it stimulated wound repair, the product attracted much attention. Because of the inquiries which the Council had received, the Council took up the consideration when the product was placed on the market for the use of physicians. ... Since the adoption in 1918 of its report holding the evidence for the therapeutic value of Tethelin insufficient to permit its admission to New and Nonofficial Remedies, the Council has received or learned of no reports which tended to establish its value. On the other hand, feeding experiments carried out at the institute of Physiology in University College, London [viz., JD.2] failed to demonstrate that the oral administration of the anterior lobe substance had any effect on the growth of test animals. In consideration of the lack of evidence for the therapeutic usefulness of Tethelin, the Council concluded the consideration of the product and declared it inadmissible to New and Nonofficial Remedies. ... When this report was sent to the Mulford Co. for consideration, prior to its publication, the firm replied that the product would not be marketed after the present stock is exhausted." — Report of the Council on Pharmacy and Chemistry of the American Medical Association for 1922.

== Tethelin (Robertson's pituitary extract) ==
In March 1916 (BR.25–BR.26), Robertson announced the results of a series of experiments that he and his assistant, Louis Adolph Ray, had conducted with white mice — chosen as Robertson's "experimental animal" because of their "hardiness, rapid growth, smallness, and fecundity" (BR.25, p.366) — wherein the oral administration of tethelin, a "growth-controlling principle" (which they later described as "the ether-precipitable fraction of an alcoholic extract of the anterior lobe of the pituitary body"), produced precisely "the same effects on their growth" as those "which [had] accompan[ied] the [oral] administration of the whole tissue of the anterior lobe of the pituitary body" to his control group (BR.27, p.397).

Everitt (AE.2, p.63) notes — having distinguished (p.66) Robertson and Ray's "growth controlling principle" of the pituitary (BR.37) from Moon, et al.'s "growth stimulating principle" (HM.3) — that it was not until the (1921) work of Herbert Evans and Joseph Long (HE.1; HE.2) that "[it was] conclusively proved that the pituitary contained a growth-stimulating hormone". Evans and Long also discovered that, whilst the oral administration of their "pituitary principle" had no effect, administration per medium of an intraperitoneal injection was effective: which led them to the conclusion that whatever the pituitary's 'active principle' might be, it was "digested in the alimentary canal".

The precise molecular structure of Robertson's "tethelin" has never been determined.

== University of Toronto ==
Despite its initial reservations centred upon Robertson's apparent "commercial leanings" (and, specifically, his decision to patent "tethelin"), and following "an unusually careful review process", the University of Toronto appointed Robertson as Professor in the Department of Biochemistry in 1918. He moved to Toronto, accompanied by Hardolph Wasteneys, who later became the head of the Toronto Department from 1929 to 1951. Robertson resigned in 1919, in order to take up his position at the University of Adelaide, and was succeeded, at Toronto, by Professor Andrew Hunter, C.B.E., F.R.S.C., F.R.S.E. (1876–1969).

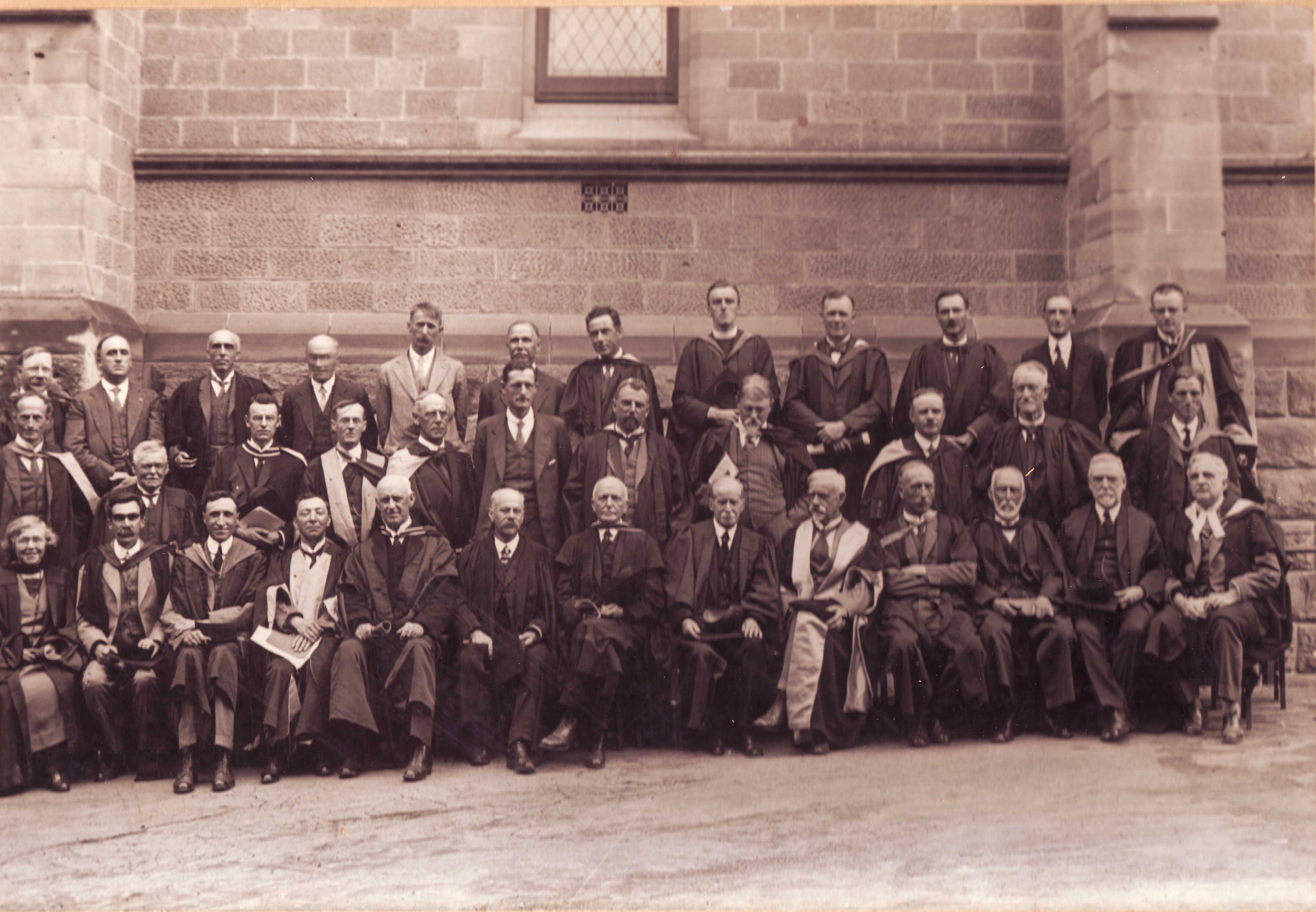
University of Adelaide Council and Staff (1923); Robertson is third from left, front row.

== University of Adelaide ==
Robertson had been rejected as a candidate for the chair in physiology at Johns Hopkins University because his reputation had been "tarnished" not only by his decision to patent tethelin, but also by his association with its potential commercial exploitation. Robertson also learned that his long post-graduate association with American universities — rather than the (preferred at the time) post-graduate work in United Kingdom — had caused his application to join the newly founded Walter and Eliza Hall Institute of Research in Pathology and Medicine, as its first Director, to be rejected in favour of the successful candidate, Sydney W. Patterson M.B. B.S., M.D., D.Sc., who had studied in the UK at University College London, and had gained his Doctor of Science (D.Sc.) from the University of London.

With a desire to return to Australia — and hoping to apply his acquired academic, administrative, and research skills, talents, and expertise to Australian circumstances — he accepted (in June 1919) the University of Adelaide's (April 1919) offer of a Chair, vacant since the (20 March 1919) death of Robertson's father-in-law, Sir Edward Stirling, who had been the university's Professor of Physiology; and, where, in the interim, Charles Kellaway, M.B. B.S., M.D., M.S. of Melbourne, had served as locum. Taking up his duties in 1920, Robertson was immediately identifying himself as "Professor of Physiology and Biochemistry"; thus, in Robertson, the University of Adelaide had the first-ever Australian Chair in Biochemistry — almost two decades before the 1938 appointments of William John Young at the University of Melbourne and Henry Priestley at the University of Sydney.

== The Medical Sciences Club of South Australia ==
The Australian Journal of Experimental Biology and Medical Science (1924).

The Medical Sciences Club of South Australia, one of the oldest scientific clubs in Australia, was founded in Adelaide in 1920 as a means through which researchers in the sciences considered fundamental to medicine and medical practitioners interested in those aspects of medicine could regularly come together for their mutual benefit and for the advancement of biological and medical science.

The club's inaugural meeting was held at the University of Adelaide on 16 April 1920. The fourteen medical men and scientists who attended the meeting were: Mr. Lionel Bull; Dr. Trent Champion de Crespigny; Dr. Raphael Cilento; Professor John Burton Cleland; Dr. Henry Fry; Dr. Frank Hone; Professor F. Wood Jones; Dr. Henry S. Newland; Dr. Robert Pulleine; Dr. William Ray; Professor Edward Rennie; Professor T. Brailsford Robertson; Dr. Malcolm Leslie Scott, M.B. B.S., M.R.C.S., F.R.C.S., M.Ch. (1882–1931); and Dr Harry Swift. The meeting appointed Dr Harry Swift as the club's temporary chairman, and Brailsford Robertson as its temporary secretary.

Aside from its regular monthly meetings, the club was responsible for the on-going, quarterly publication of The Australian Journal of Experimental Biology and Medical Science from its first issue (March 1924) until its last issue (December 1986), after which it was re-named Immunology & Cell Biology.

== The Chemical Basis of Growth and Senescence (1923) ==
In between 1916 and 1920 Robertson published a series of 16 papers in the Journal of Biological Chemistry under the title Experimental Studies on Growth. The papers became the foundation of his (1923) textbook, The Chemical Basis of Growth and Senescence (BR.41): a work that examined the "self-accelerated" natural processes of growth and aging in plants, animals, and humans (as they were understood at that time).

Using mathematical principles, Robertson employed an S-Curve (a.k.a. 'sigmoid curve') (BR.41, p.5) to demonstrate both the "autokinetic phase" of a "self-accelerated" growth process, "during which the rate of growth is continuously increasing" (p.4), and its "autostatic phase", "during which the rate of growth is decreasing" (p.4). Drawing an analogy to the autocatalyzed chemical reactions of Wilhelm Ostwald (father of his Berkeley colleague Wolfgang Ostwald), Robertson referred to these "self-accelerated" processes as being "autocatalyzed" (p.6). As Lee and Hanson observed (in 1947), "[Robertson's] theory of autocatalytic control over growth ... has been variously rejected, acknowledged and accepted by investigators" (RL.1, p.53).

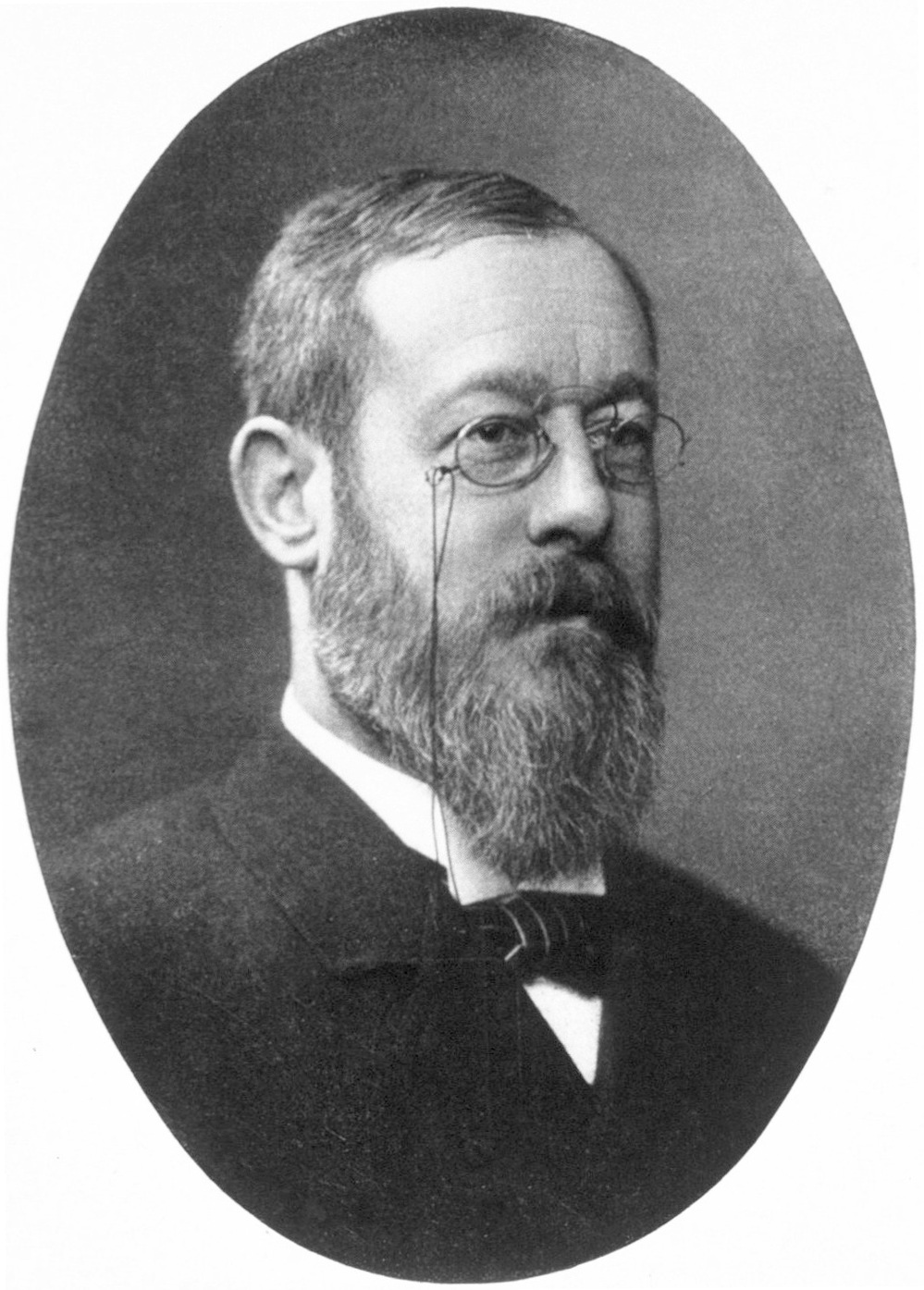
Josef von Mering (1849–1908)

Oskar Minkowski (1858–1931)

== "Insulin" ==
"In 1920 the diagnosis of diabetes, particularly in the young and the very young, was essentially a death sentence."
"The discovery of insulin represents a real breakthrough that has revolutionized both the therapy and the prognosis of people with diabetes ... Before insulin, diabetes was a dreadful condition associated with bad prognosis and miserable quality of life ... [progressing to] the ineluctable coma-death sequence.

In 1889, Joseph von Mering and Oskar Minkowski, in Straßburg, Alsace–Lorraine, reported that, in every case, the complete removal of an experimental dog's pancreas produced severe and fatal diabetes. They hypothesized that the consequent diabetic state was "due to loss of an 'internal secretion' of the pancreas rather than [to a loss] of the pancreatic exocrine secretion" (GL.2, p.2). Their finding was confirmed by the total pancreatectomy experiments Charles Édouard Eutrope "Emmanuel" Hédon (1863–1933) conducted on his experimental dogs, in Montpellier, in between 1890 and 1913. In November 1911, Anton Carlson and Fred Drennan at the University of Chicago discovered that a pregnant experimental animal did not become diabetic through the removal of its pancreas.

Over the ensuing years, as the endocrine functions of the pancreas (glucagon, insulin, etc.) — i.e., rather than its exocrine functions (pancreatic juice, etc.) — were becoming increasingly better understood, "many investigators [had] endeavoured to obtain some beneficial effect in diabetes mellitus: either by feeding pancreas, or by administration of pancreatic extracts" (FB.2, p.141).In between 1890 and 1920, a range of scientists reported that the 'pancreatic extracts' (of varying degrees of purity and potency) that they had produced resulted in the suppression of glycosuria and the reduction of blood sugar in their experimental animals. Among others, these included: Eugène Gley (Paris, France); George Ludwig Zuelzer (Berlin, Germany); Ernest Lyman Scott (New York, NY); John Raymond Murlin and Benjamin Kramer (Rochester, New York); Israel Kleiner and Samuel James Meltzer (New York, NY); and Nicolae Paulescu (Bucharest, Romania).

"Between 1910 and 1921 clinicians and physiologists were unanimous that attempts to cure severe diabetes by feeding or injecting pancreatic extracts had failed."— Robert Tattersall(1995).

On 20 December 1893, perhaps inspired by the earlier work of Charles-Édouard Brown-Séquard, — and anticipating the later "monkey gland" transplants of Serge Voronoff — Patrick Watson-Williams (1863-1938) at the Bristol Royal Infirmary made the first recorded attempt to treat diabetes with a pancreas xenotransplant. His attempt was unsuccessful. It was not until 17 December 1966, in Minneapolis, Minnesota, that William D. Kelly (1922-2006), assisted by Richard C. Lillehei, performed the first successful pancreatic transplant.

=== Structure ===
The complete chemical structure of insulin was eventually determined by Frederick Sanger and Edward Owen Paul Thompson (1925–2012) in 1953 (FS.2; FS.3; FS.4); in 1965 (YW.1; YS.1), the team led by Wang Yinglai (王应睐/王應睞) was not only the first to create synthetic insulin, but was also, in the process, the first to produce a biologically active organic compound from inorganic chemicals; and, in 1969 (MA.4; TB.1) Dorothy Hodgkin's team established the complete 3-dimensional structure of insulin, using X-ray crystallography, in the Chemical Crystallography Laboratory and the Laboratory of Molecular Biophysics at the University of Oxford.

"Insulin is a peptide hormone, which is produced and released by beta cells of the pancreatic islets, that finely tunes the metabolism of carbohydrates, fats and protein inducing the uptake of glucose from the blood into fat, liver and skeletal muscle cells"—Vecchio, Tornali, Bragazzii & Martini (2018).

==== Animal-sourced insulin ====
In 1923, Doisy, Somogyi and Shaffer reported that, having modified Banting, Best, and Collip's "methods", the substance they had extracted from bovine pancreases "appeared to be an albumose or globulin" (ED.1, p.xxxi) (i.e., a protein); in December 1925, John Jacob Abel was the first to produce a crystalline form of the "extract" (JM.5, p.343); and, in 1935, Hans Friedrich Jensen (1896-1959) and Earl A. Evans Jr., working in Abel's laboratory, confirmed Doisy, Somogyi, and Shaffer's earlier speculations when they isolated the amino acids (i.e. proteins) phenylalanine and proline from Abel's refined crystals (HJ.1).

==== Biosynthetic insulin ====
Due to the successful production of the first reliable genetically engineered (recombinant) synthetic human insulin from Escherichia coli, by David Goeddel and his colleagues at Genentech, in late 1978 (DG.1), its approval by the U.S. Food and Drug Administration (FDA) on 28 October 1982 (YV.1), the on-going difficulties associated with the production from (and limited supply of) bovine or porcine pancreases, and the more recent concerns over transmissible spongiform encephalopathies associated with animal-products, insulin is no longer manufactured from animal sources (JB.1, p.403). According to Kjeldsen, et al. (TK.1, pp.464, 466), without the capacity to produce genetically engineered insulin at an industrial scale from either Escherichia coli (1978) or Saccharomyces cerevisiae (1987) — and assuming the average insulin content of a porcine pancreas is 10 mg — the amount of insulin needed for worldwide insulin treatments would require at least 4 billion pigs (which, they note, is "more than four times the number of pigs in the world").

It's the dose that makes the poison

Alle Dinge sind Gift, und nichts ist ohne Gift; allein die Dosis macht, dass ein Ding kein Gift ist.
All things are poison, and nothing is without poison; the dosage alone makes it, so a thing is not a poison.
Paracelsus, 1538.

=== Narrow therapeutic index ===
Despite its modern (Pharmacopoeia specified) standard structure, storage stability, potency, purity, and unit strength, with its narrow therapeutic index — i.e., difference between its minimum effective dose (MED) and its toxic dose (TD) — and, as well, the small difference between its toxic dose and its lethal dose (LD), insulin remains a dangerous, high-alert medication (HAM).

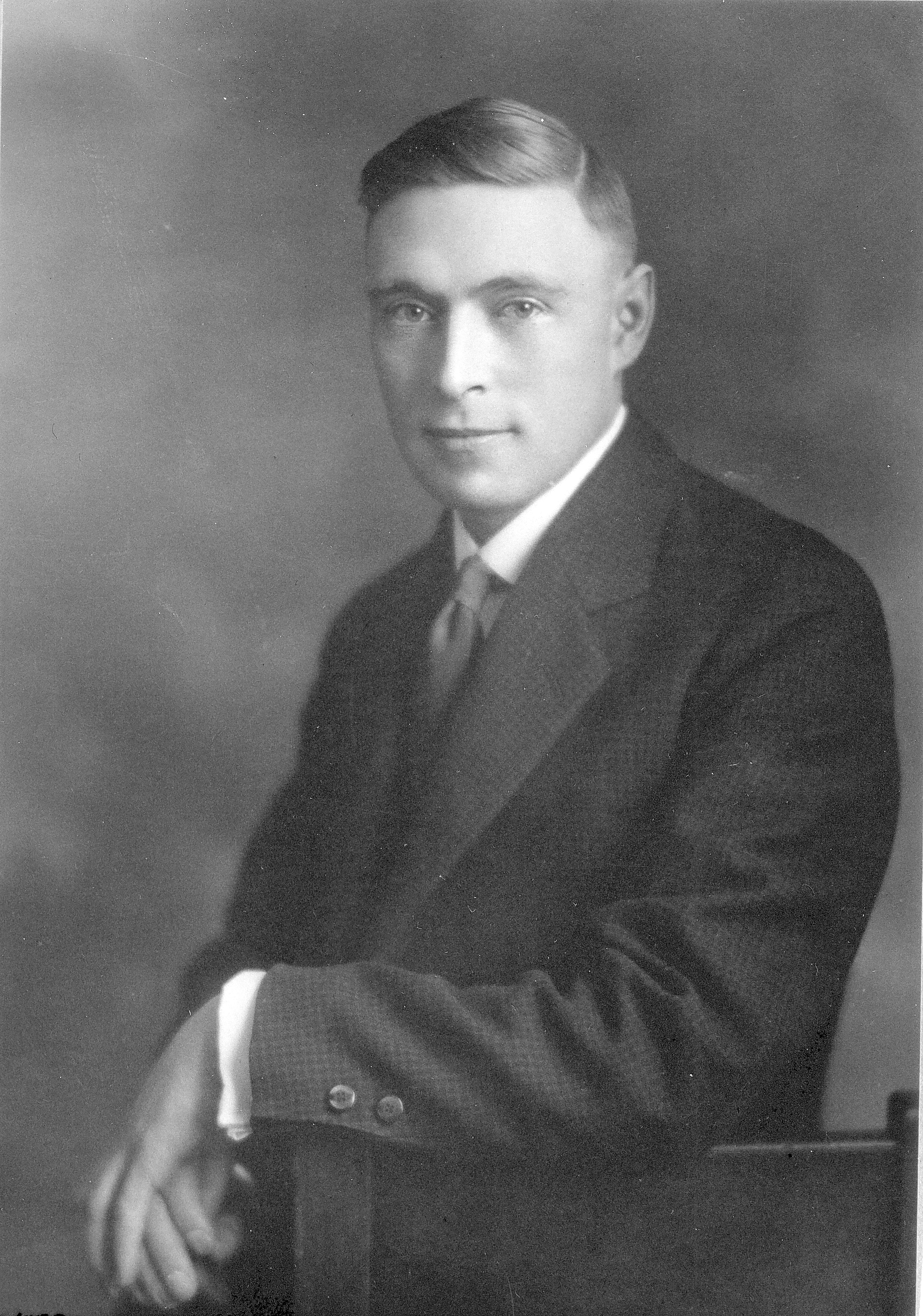
James Bertram Collip, Ph.D. in 1929.

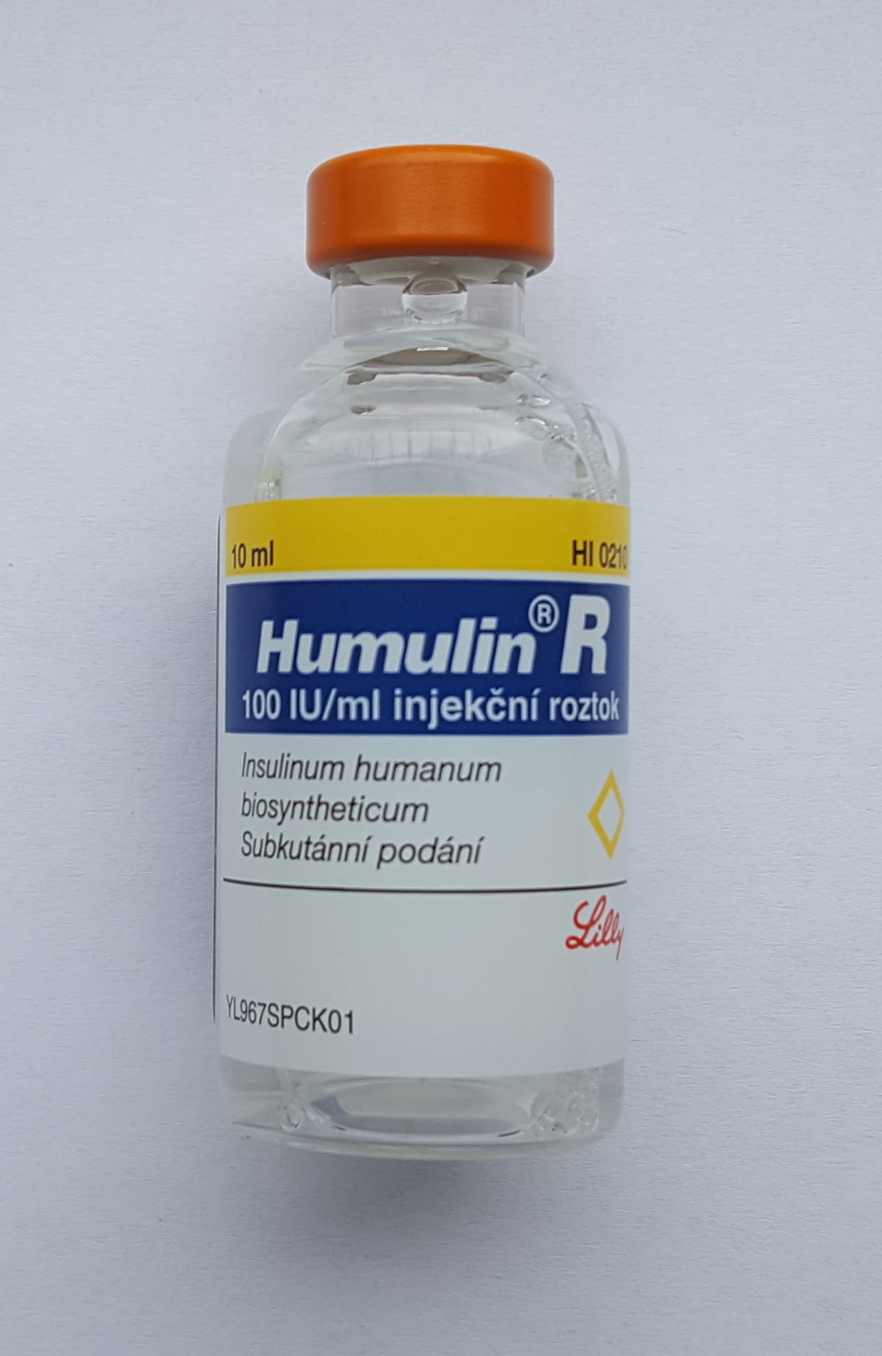
A 10mL vial of insulin. Concentration = 100 IU(International Units)/mL (U-100). Thus, vial contains 1000 International Units.

== Issues of dosage quantification and standardization ==
In his December 1921/January 1922 efforts to produce a sufficiently pure pancreatic extract for human use (see below), James Collip used rabbits (as well as Banting and Best's dogs) as his experimental animals. When he administered large doses of the extract to his rabbits, many of them convulsed, collapsed, had seizures and, finally, died: i.e., a dangerous, lethal insulin overdose. Having clearly identified the extract's toxicity, on one occasion he decided to take a blood sample from one of his convulsing rabbits. He then took the (at the time) extraordinary step of injecting the same rabbit with some glucose mixed with water. Biochemist Oliver Henry Gaebler (1895–1985), who had personally witnessed Collip's glucose intervention, on that day, whilst working in the same laboratory as Collip as a "pre-doctoral fellow" under direction of Victor John Harding (1885–1934), the Professor of Pathology, later remarked, "It all looks simple now, but it was the most thinking per square meter per minute that I have seen". The rabbit recovered. The blood test later not only revealed that "there had almost been no sugar in the rabbit's bloodstream", but also that Collip "had discovered the phenomenon that would later be called insulin shock".

As Knopp and her associates note (JK.1), in today's world, manufacturers' standard samples still have their universally agreed-upon potency (i.e., its specific biological activity) precisely expressed, by convention, in international units (IU): with one international unit of insulin (1 IU) defined as the "biological equivalent" of 34.7 μg pure crystalline insulin. Yet, as they also note, there is still no universally agreed-upon "conversion factor" to express the mass of that same standard sample in International System Units (SI).

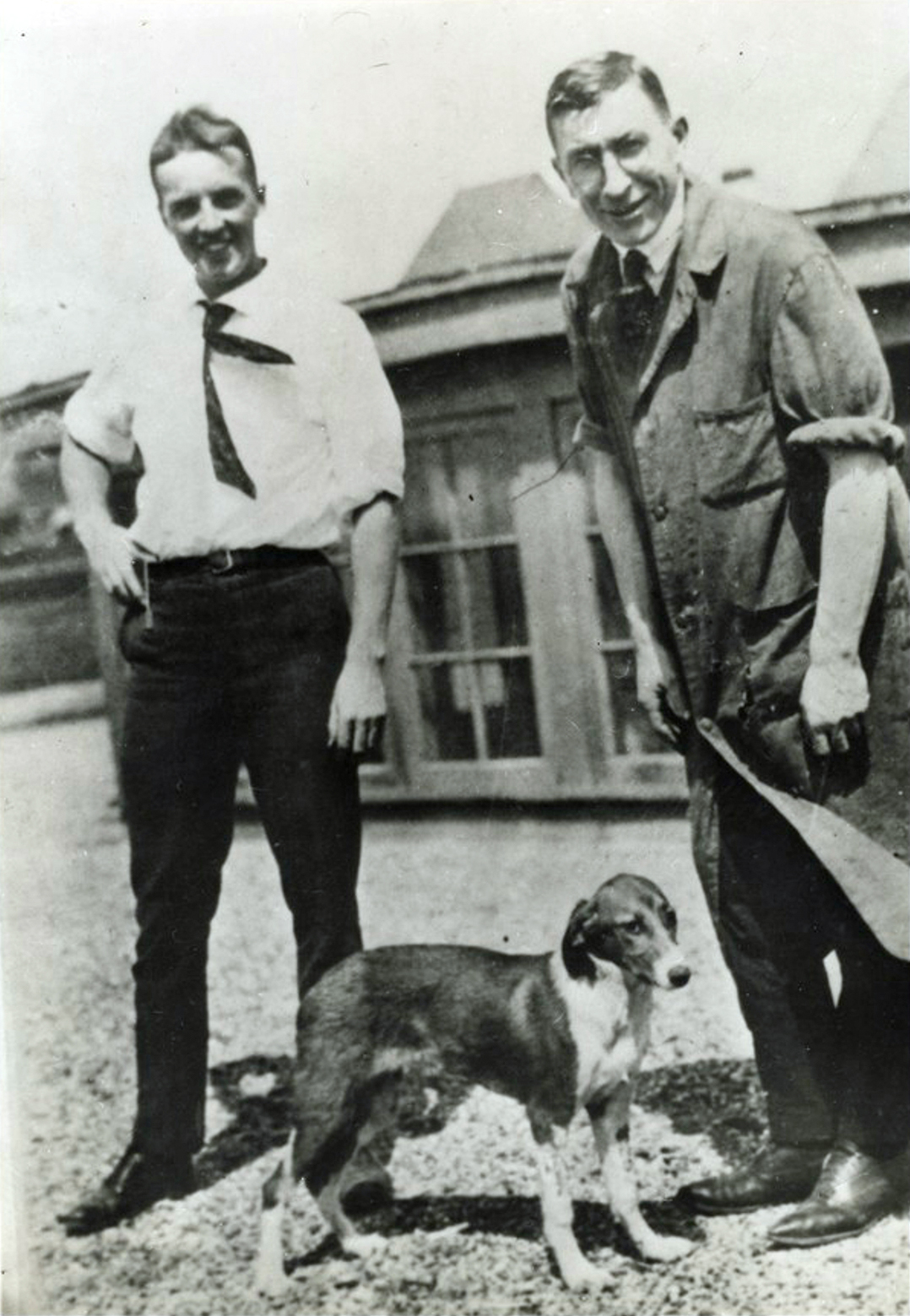
Charles Best and Frederick Banting with Dog 408, one of their experimental animals, Toronto University, August 1921.

== "Insulin" and University of Toronto ==
=== Banting and Best ===
In April 1921, using the "well-equipped, funded laboratory" of the Department's Head (and former assistant to Brailsford Robertson) John Macleod at the Physiology Department of the University of Toronto, Frederick Banting — "a battlefield surgeon with minimal research experience", and former general practitioner from London, Ontario — its pharmacology lecturer, and Charles Best, Macleod's undergraduate/postgraduate student, began their series of experiments, using depancreatized (thus, "diabetic") dogs as their experimental animals, seeking to discover a process through which "the active principle of the extracts of degenerated [bovine] pancreas" could be preserved without being destroyed, as was the case with the (then) current extraction processes.

According to the Tufts' Professor of Clinical Medicine, Joseph H. Pratt (JP.2, pp.286-288), the on-going efforts of Banting and Best were no improvement upon the work of George Ludwig Zuelzer fifteen years earlier (GZ.2): Zuelzer, despite having been "on the right track" (in relation to recognizing the potential efficacy of a pancreatic extract in the treatment of diabetes mellitus) and, "even with the able assistance of the staff of the Physiological Institute of the University of Berlin as well as that of the trained chemists of the Schering Company over a period of four years [viz., prior to GZ.2], had been unable to lessen its toxicity sufficiently to have it employed clinically" (pp.286-288).

Problems of extraction.

The difficulties encountered in the preparation of suitable pancreatic extracts ... may be classed under four headings:
(1) the destruction of the active principle by oral administration;
(2) the toxicity of the first types of extracts when given intravenously;
(3) the interference of the enzymes contained in the acini when extracts were made of the whole gland; and
(4) the influence of the medium used for extraction."
Medical Woman's Journal, June 1924.

An extract from cattle pancreases that had been independently prepared by Best and Banting, which they considered pure enough to be administered to a human (rather than an experimental animal), had been administered to 13-year-old Leonard Thompson by Edward S. Jeffrey (rather than Banting) in the Toronto General Hospital on 11 January 1922, less than eight months after the research began (CB.5, p.303). The "Banting-Best extract", 7.5 cc/mL of which was injected into each of Thomson's buttocks (DL.2, p.e14), was "a murky, light-brown liquid containing much sediment, which dissolved to a considerable extent on being warmed" (WC.1, p.68). It had "no clinical benefit", and Thompson developed an abscess at the injection site because of "the impurities in the injection".

=== Banting, Best, and Collip ===
"As the results obtained by Banting and Best [with their "diabetic dogs" (FB.1)] led us to expect that potent extracts, suitable for administration to the human diabetic subject, could be prepared, one of us (J.B.C[ollip]) took up the problem of the isolation of the active principle of the gland. As a result of this latter investigation, an extract has been prepared from the whole gland, which is sterile and highly potent, and which can be administered subcutaneously to the human subject."
Frederick Banting, Charles Best, James Collip, Walter Campbell, and Almon Fletcher, March 1922.

Following the ("scientific", rather than "industrial") discoveries, insights, and experimental advances achieved by Banting and Best's experiments with "diabetic dogs", the efforts of Macleod, Banting, and Best — as described in their 30 December 1921 presentation ("The Beneficial Influences of Certain Pancreatic Extracts on Pancreatic Diabetes") to the American Physiological Society — were significantly improved when the biochemist, James Collip, Assistant Professor of Biochemistry at University of Alberta (already at Toronto under a Rockefeller Travelling Fellowship) joined the team on 12 December 1921.

Collip not only had considerable research experience with "internal secretions, but also had considerable experience in making and administering tissue extracts". In Pratt's view, it was entirely due to his expertise that Collip was able to produce far purer, and far less toxic extract than Banting and Best's version in just five weeks. Pratt was certain that, without Collip, the Toronto team would never have been able to produce an extract that was safe enough to administer to any human being; and, according to Michael Bliss, "Banting's and Best's research was so badly done that, without the help of Macleod and Collip, and a much more subtle view of the constituents of the discovery of insulin, the two young Canadians would [have been] fated to disappear from medical history".

Within a week of Banting and Best's 11 January 1922 failure, Collip had independently refined and developed an entirely new extraction method, which produced a sufficiently free-of-contaminant extract of the "active principle" that the team believed a human could tolerate. The "Collip extract" was successfully administered to the almost moribund Thompson at the Toronto General Hospital on 23 January 1922, in the first-ever life-saving treatment of diabetes mellitus, now known as Type 1 diabetes. Thompson lived for another 13 years; he died, aged 27, of bronchopneumonia. In March 1922 (FB.2) the team reported that another 6 patients had been successfully treated with the "Collip extract" in February 1922: and, by December 1922, Campbell, Fletcher and Banting (under the supervision of Professor Duncan A. Graham at the Toronto General Hospital) had treated "over fifty cases of diabetes mellitus" with insulin; some of which "had been under treatment continuously for several months".

By 22 February 1922, the Toronto team were reporting that "the effects observed in depancreatized animals have been paralleled in man", that the condition of seven patients had been "favourably influenced" by the daily injection of the extract, that "the patients themselves report[ed] a subjective subjective sense of well being and increased vigor for a period following the [extract's] administration", and that "[whilst] the nature of the improvement seen clinically as a result of the administration of these extracts ... is of a temporary nature, we believe that it justifies the hope of more permanent results following more adequate and carefully regulated dosage".

=== Patent ===
Banting and Macleod's 1923 Nobel Prize for Physiology or Medicine (Diploma): "for the discovery of insulin"

Fully aware that it was "an extraordinarily effective but dangerous drug", and "despite [the] prevailing hostility in the medical profession as regards drug patents", Banting, Best, and Collip patented their extract in 1923, in order to have some control over its purity, quality, potency, manufacture, and sale. Although the Toronto team's initial (1922) announcements (FB.1; FB.2) and their later (1923) patent application (FB.8) only spoke of "pancreatic extracts", they were using the name "insulin" as a generic umbrella term to label their extraction product as early as May 1922.

=== Nobel Prize in Physiology or Medicine (1923) ===
In October 1923, in controversial circumstances, Banting and Macleod were jointly awarded the 1923 Nobel Prize in Physiology or Medicine "for the discovery of insulin". As Tattersall notes, "it is very unusual for Nobel Prizes to be awarded within two years of a discovery and to people nominated for the first time" (RT.3, p.61). Within a month of the award ceremony, Banting had given Best one-half of his share in the $US24,000 prize, and Macleod had given Collip one-half of his share.

== "Insulin" and "pancreatic extracts" (1922/1924) ==
"Early ["insulin"] treatment was plagued by shortages of supply and variable potency, and required large injected volumes (typically 3 to 7 mL) that resulted in painful, sterile or infected, subcutaneous abscesses, frequent hypoglycemia, and suboptimal glycemic control that, in the long term, increased the risk of the life-threatening or life-altering complications of nephropathy, circulatory problems, lower-extremity amputations, and blindness." — Gary F Lewis & Patricia L. Brubaker (2021).

Once it became apparent from "the rising number of requests for the treatment" (JS.2, p.4) that the combined laboratory equipment, staff, and resources of the Toronto team and those of the associated Connaught Laboratories (located on the Toronto campus) were unable to deliver the required large-scale commercial volume of "insulin", the Insulin Committee of the University Toronto, having begun the initial "collaboration" in May 1922 (JS.2, p.5), negotiated an exclusive, final contract with the US drug manufacturer Eli Lilly and Company on 30 June 1923.

In April 1923, The British Medical Journal published a summary (MA.3) of the (commercial) "insulin" treatments delivered as part of pre-commercial-release trials conducted on behalf of the Medical Research Council of the United Kingdom in eight different hospitals in England and Scotland. These trials confirmed the Toronto team's findings. The Council approved its general use in Britain in April 1923 (MA.2). Also, in June 1923 (MB.1, Preface), Frederick Madison Allen, the former advocate of carbohydrate-restricted diets for diabetes mellitus, and editor of The Journal of Metabolic Research, announced that the printing November/December 1922 issue of his journal had been delayed until May 1923, in order to present a collection of articles (submitted between January and May 1923) that reported on the efficacious clinical outcomes of treatments with the "insulin" that had been exclusively supplied (from its small-scale production) to each of the ten experimental groups by Eli Lilly & Co. in the pre-contract interim period.

In relation to the cost per dose of the (then) limited supply of "insulin", Woods Hutchinson, M.D. (WH.2, p.146) estimated that, in June 1923, "without allowing anything for the time and expert services of the investigators or the overhead and interest on the cost of the elaborate and expensive laboratory plant", one month's treatment of a patient would cost about $US100 (i.e., approx. $AUS2,830 in 2026).

Response to press reports of hostile Medical Journal of Australia article.

"In recent issues of the daily press ... there has appeared an account of an article published in the "Medical Journal of Australia", in which doubt is cast upon the efficacy of insulin, the new specific for the treatment of diabetes. The assertion is made that it is a dangerous drug by means of which "hundreds of diabetics will be hastened to their graves".
"It is most unfortunate that this exaggerated and totally unfounded statement should have been communicated to the press. A quite baseless apprehension of danger may thus be created in the minds of patients who would otherwise have subjected themselves to the treatment with the confidence which it deserves. The article which is quoted is unsigned, and there is nothing to show that its author has the slightest practical acquaintance with the effects of insulin upon diabetics.
"The views which he expresses are contrary to the unanimous opinion of all the leading authorities on diabetes in Europe and America, and opinions expressed, not anonymously, but with the signatures of many of the most eminent medical investigators in the world.
"We have already had considerable experience of the effects of insulin in Adelaide since the Department of Bio-chemistry [sic] has been engaged in its manufacture for the past eight months.
"During this time a considerable number of severe cases have been treated by local physicians, and the results have communicated to this laboratory.
"As a result of this experience I can state that every case which has been treated with our produce, has been benefited, some to a remarkable degree.
"Although many doses have been administered to child and adult patients, in no instance has any deleterious effect been observed.
"In America I learn that no fewer than 5,000 diabetics are being treated with insulin, and no case of any patient having been "hurried into his grave" by the treatment, has been reported. ...
"In England the Medical Research Council, comprising some of the most eminent authorities in the medical world, have reported their experience of insulin,and their report coincides with our own gained locally.
"It is difficult, therefore, to imagine from what source the author of the article quoted could have gathered his unfavorable impression of insulin.
T. Brailsford Robertson, The (Adelaide) Register, 5 September 1923.

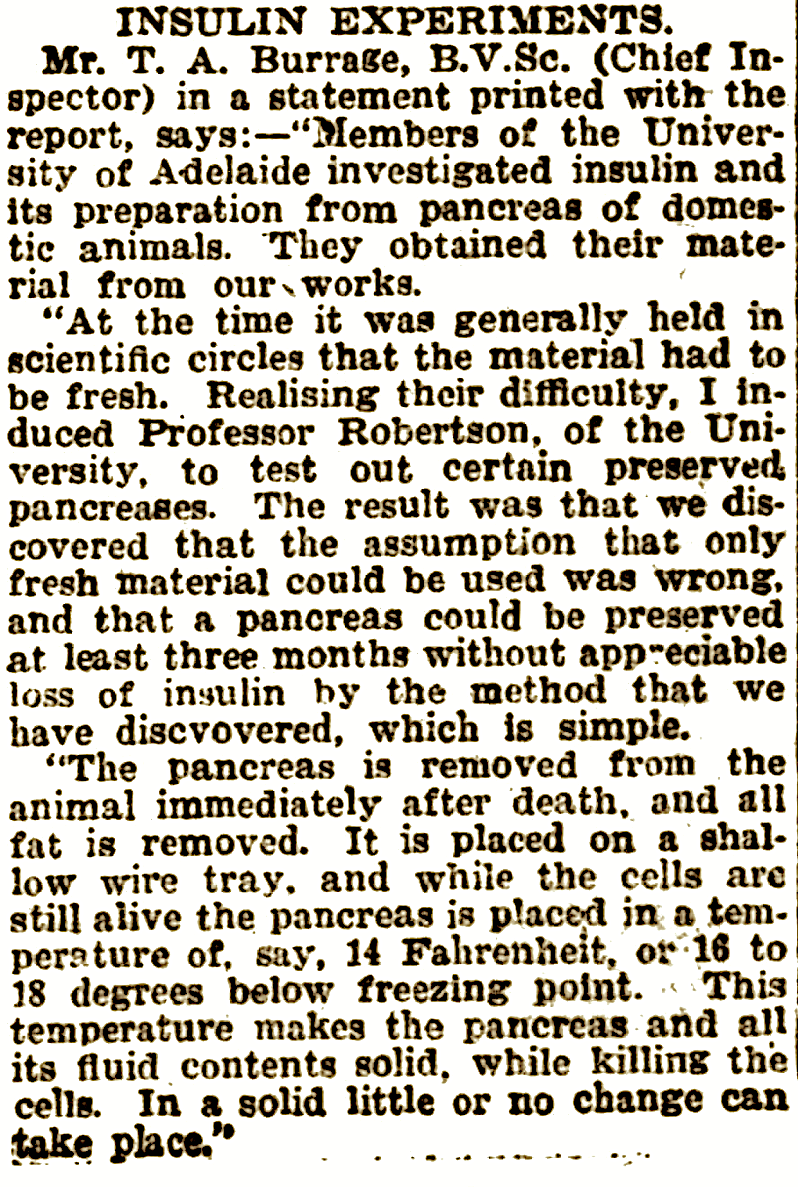
Thomas Alan Burrage, B.V.Sc., Chief Inspector, Adelaide Abattoirs (1924).

== "Insulin" and University of Adelaide ==
On 6 October 1922, Robertson presented a brief account of the Toronto work ("Pancreatic Extract and Diabetes") to the Medical Sciences Club of South Australia.

Once Robertson's team had been able to (locally) produce enough safe-to-administer "insulin", the first treatments with the Adelaide-produced "insulin" were delivered by Robertson's Medical Science Club colleague, Dr. Trent Champion de Crespigny (Honorary Physician to the Adelaide Children's Hospital). The first treated was gravely-ill 9 years-old Dawson Hanna (1913–1926), at the Adelaide Children's Hospital on 7 January 1923, who lived for another three years. The first adult treated with Adelaide-produced insulin was the comatose and moribund 34 years-old Clifford Harry Cornish (1888–1954), at the Adelaide Hospital on 31 January 1923, who lived for another thirty years. All of the Adelaide-produced insulin used for these treatments had been delivered "free of charge" to the patients. Robertson and his research team at the University of Adelaide had significantly improved the extraction, purity, and speed of manufacture of insulin and had, in the process, produced more than 40,000 doses of insulin.

In his (14 November) contribution to the 1923 Australasian Medical Congress's discussion on the significance of insulin in the treatment of diabetes, Trent Champion de Crespigny reported that the experiments he and Robertson had conducted in Adelaide earlier that year had conclusively demonstrated that "giving insulin by the mouth instead of by injection" had no effect whatsoever.

=== Commonwealth Serum Laboratories ===
The second patient treated in Melbourne with the (still experimental) CSL insulin was James Frederick Loveday (1880-1936) in June 1923.

On 1 May 1924, the future research and manufacture of insulin was entirely transferred over to the Commonwealth Serum Laboratories, then a division of the Commonwealth Department of Health, and located in Royal Park, Melbourne.

== Council for Scientific and Industrial Research (CSIR) ==
Immediately following Prime Minister Billy Hughes' 22 December 1915 "National Laboratory Conference" announcement at a Melbourne University luncheon, the British Science Guild sent the Prime Minister a copy of its (hitherto ignored) 1914 Report, with Robertson's (1913) Report on the Scope and Administration of an Institute for Scientific Research in Australia (BR.15) appended to it.

The formal gathering was convened in Melbourne on 5 January 1916; and a Commonwealth Advisory Council of Science and Industry was established, "with over twenty members representing a cross-section of scientific, state, and business interests". On 12 December 1916, the Council's Acting Secretary, Gerald Lightfoot, submitted his Memorandum on the Organization of Scientific Research Institutions in the United States of America (GL.1), to the Council to send on to the Prime Minister. On 14 September 1920, an Institute of Science and Industry, with Sir George Knibbs as its Director, was established by the Institute of Science and Industry Act 1920 (CA.1).

=== The Council ===
On 21 June 1926, exercising its powers under the provisions of Section 51 and Section 81 of the Commonwealth Constitution, the Commonwealth Government established the Council for Scientific and Industrial Research (CSIR), per medium of the enabling legislation of the Science and Industry Research Act 1926 (CA.2). The Council consisted of eleven members: three Commonwealth nominees, who formed the Executive Committee (and one of whom would be appointed chairman), and, in addition to the six State chairmen, another two co-opted members. They were, collectively, a very representative group: two engineers, two chemists, two biologists, one representative of agricultural science, one geologist, one representative of veterinary science, one representative of manufacturing industries, and one representative of the agricultural and pastoral industries.

Robertson attended the Council's first official meeting, in Melbourne, on 22 June 1926, as the acting chairman of the South Australian Committee. Robertson was acting in place of Arnold Richardson (Director of the Waite Agricultural Research Institute), its intended permanent chairman, who was overseas at the time. Along with George Julius and David Rivett, Richardson was (subsequently) officially appointed to the Executive Committee in 1927, and Robertson served as South Australia's chairman from 1927 until he was replaced by W.J. Young in 1929.

== Division of Animal Nutrition ==
In March 1927, due to the concerted efforts of Professor David Rivett an agreement was reached with the University of Adelaide that Robertson would be relieved of his teaching duties, while continuing his relationship with the university, and Robertson became the head of the CSIR's first-ever division, the Division of Animal Nutrition.

A red brick two-storey building, funded by the Commonwealth Government, and dedicated to animal nutrition research, was designed by the university's architect, Louis Laybourne-Smith. It contained a special laboratory designed by Robertson, and was erected by the CSIR on the university's campus "upon land very generously made available for this purpose by the University" (BR.67). The CSIR Building, known today as The Brailsford Robertson Building, was opened by the Prime Minister, Stanley Bruce, on 22 October 1928.

In 1929, Robertson and his Animal Nutrition Division colleagues continued his earlier studies on the growth and longevity of white mice (AE.2, p.61); and, despite Robertson's death in 1930, his colleagues went on to complete the work and subsequently published their results: EB.1, EB.2, EB.3, EB.4, and EB.5.

== Publications ==
Australian confectionery advertisement (1933) quoting from Brailsford Robertson's Principles of Biochemistry (1920).

Robertson published widely over a range of scientific subjects, including his life-long interest in the biochemical processes underlying higher nervous functions and cognition. In 1932, the Australian biochemist, Mary Campbell Dawbarn, compiled an extensive list of Robertson's publications for The Robertson Memorial Volume. She cited 7 books, 174 articles, and 26 other items, published between 1904 and 1929 of which Robertson was joint author. His publications included an early (1914) work, especially written for children; and, later, three significant textbooks, one of which had two editions:

- 1914: The Universe and the Mayonnaise and Other Stories for Children, London: John Lane. (BR.17)
- 1918: The Physical Chemistry of the Proteins, New York, NY: Longmans, Green and Co. (BR.34)
- 1920: Principles of Biochemistry: For Students of Medicine, Agriculture and Related Sciences, Philadelphia: Lea & Febiger. (BR.38).
- 1923: The Chemical Basis of Growth and Senescence, Philadelphia: J.P. Lippincott. (BR.41)
- 1924: Principles of Biochemistry: For Students of Medicine, Agriculture and Related Sciences (Second Edition), Philadelphia: Lea & Febiger. (BR.54).

== Affiliations and appointments ==
Robertson was highly regarded in his lifetime for his contributions to science. He belonged to a wide range of prestigious scientific organizations:

- Associate Professor of Physiological Chemistry: University of California (1910–1916).
- Professor of Biochemistry: University of California (1916–1918).
- Professor of Biochemistry: University of Toronto (1918–1919).
- Professor of Physiology and Biochemistry: University of Adelaide (1919–1930).
- Dean of the Faculty of Science: University of Adelaide (1922–1923).
- Honorary Bio-Chemist: Adelaide Hospital (1926).
- Foreign member: Accademia Nazionale dei Lincei, in Rome.
- Fellow: American Association for the Advancement of Science.
- Fellow: Royal Society of South Australia.
- Member: American Association for Cancer Research.
- Member: American Physiological Society.
- Member: Australian National Research Council.
- Member: Biochemical Society (England).
- Member: Society for Experimental Biology and Medicine (New York).
- Founder: Medical Sciences Club of South Australia.
- Founder: Animal Products Research Foundation, at the University of Adelaide in 1920.
- Joint founder (1924) and ongoing editor (1924–1930): Australian Journal of Experimental Biology and Medical Science.
- Head: CSIR Division of Animal Nutrition (1927-1930).

== Death ==
He collapsed at his university laboratory bench, having insisted on continuing to work during a heat wave, despite having an influenza-caused high temperature. He died of pneumonia, several days later, at Warringa Private Hospital, in Glenelg, South Australia on 18 January 1930. He was cremated on 20 January 1930, at West Terrace Cemetery, and his ashes were scattered in Waterfall Gully, South Australia.

== Tributes ==
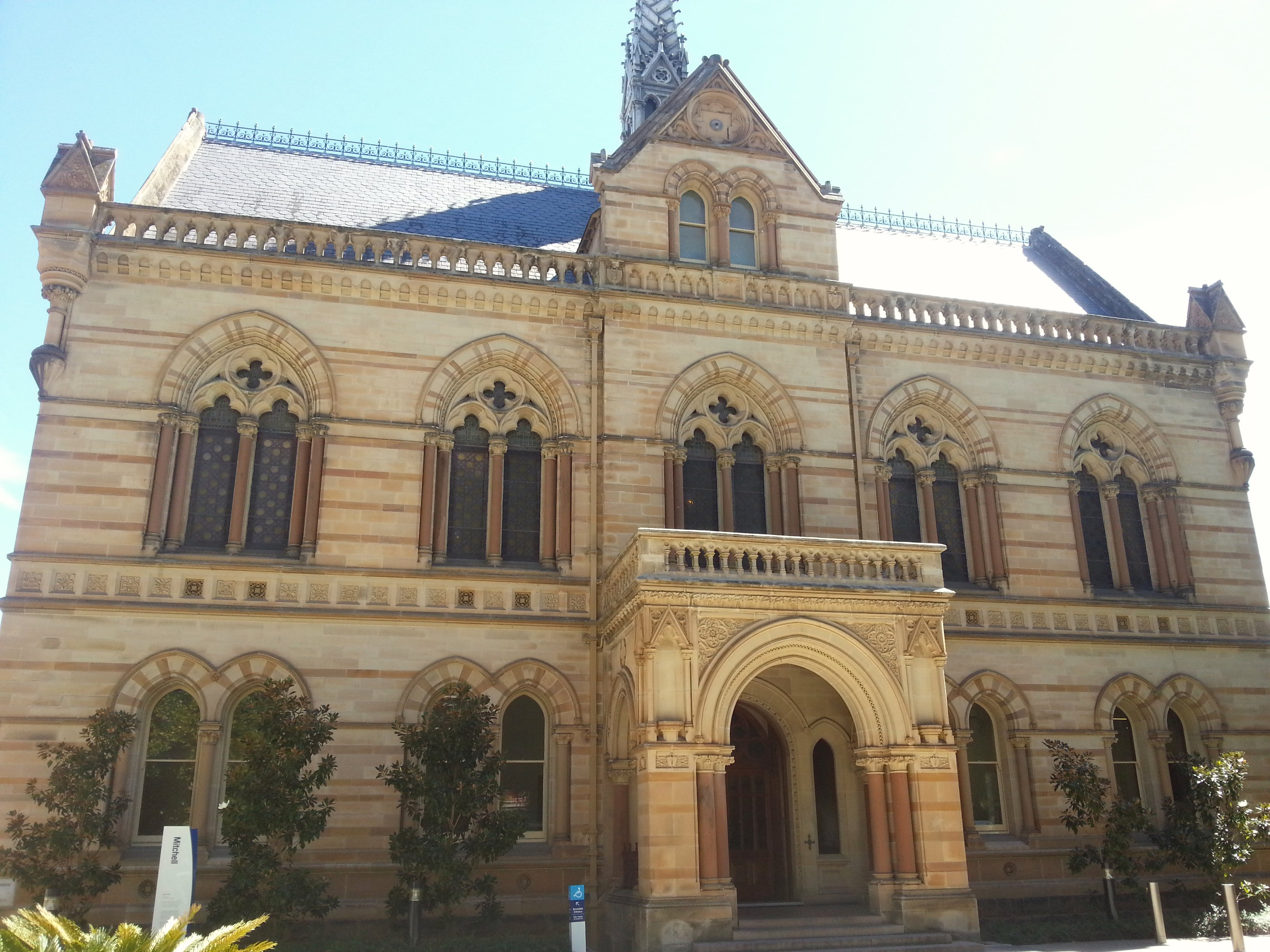
Mitchell Building, University of Adelaide.

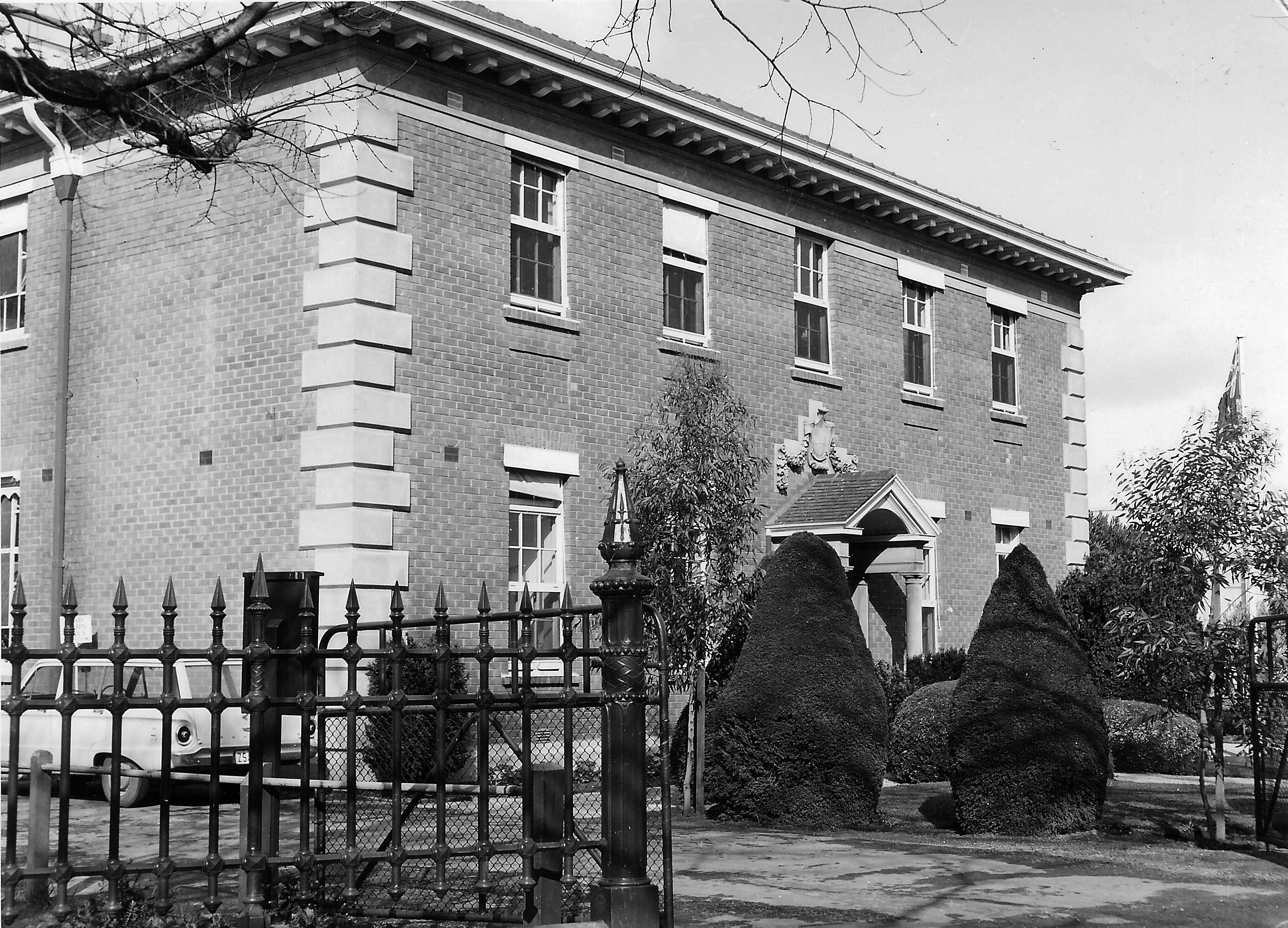
The Brailsford Robertson Building, University of Adelaide.

"Referring to the death of Professor Brailsford Robertson yesterday, the Prime Minister (Mr. Scullin) said:— His untimely end has robbed Australia of a brilliant scientist, whose contribution to the Commonwealth's progress would always be remembered. On behalf of the Federal Ministry Mr. Scullin extended his sincere sympathy to Professor Robertson's family, and expressed its appreciation of the great national services which he had rendered."
The Argus, 20 January 1930.
"Professor Brailsford Robertson was one of Australia's most brilliant scientists. The value of the work he was accomplishing cannot be estimated."
Hon. R.L. Butler, Premier of South Australia, 20 January 1930.
"The main purpose of [Robertson's] studies was to solve the mystery of physical life in it successive stages of commencement, growth, decline, and cessation, for the benefit of his fellow-men. ... The amount of original work he accomplished in his short life was prodigious. I would be rash to assert that the loss to science, or as I should prefer to say, the loss to humanity, caused by his death is irreparable, but it will probably be a long time before anyone else is able to gather the threads together and produce the fabric he was attempting to weave on his loom."
Sir George Murray, Chancellor of the University of Adelaide, 18 March 1932.
"Aged only 45. it seemed that Robertson had many years of brilliant work ahead of him. His vast investigations into fundamental principles of bio-chemistry, especially the physical chemistry of the proteins and the chemical basis of growth and senescence had equipped him in a unique manner for the attack which he was making upon the immense problems of animal nutrition in Australia. For the time being he was concentrating upon the sheep, working along fundamental lines in his laboratory and applying and testing the results on a large scale at field stations ... He was about to extend this work very considerably during the present year, and one knows that he had completely won the confidence of the graziers in the States in which he was working and was assured of the unstinted support in his plans. ... No one can estimate the seriousness of the check which his sudden passing has given to scientific work in connection with the pastoral industry of Australia, and, indeed, to science generally."
A.C. David Rivett, Chief Executive Officer of CSIR, 20 January 1930.
"His premature death, at the comparatively early age of forty-five years, removes one of the most active and valuable workers from biochemical research, and is a very serious loss to the recently instituted movement for the more rapid application of biological knowledge to the development of animal husbandry in Australia."
James B. Overton, Professor of Plant Physiology at the University of Wisconsin, Nature.
"Biological science has lost, in Robertson, one of its most brilliant and energetic exponents. ... He was one of those vigorous, fearless thinkers who seem to be entirely free from the inhibitions which restrain most of us in narrow paths of scientific enquiry. ... His magnificent courage and imagination led him into every aspect of biology which presented problems to his consciousness. ... His originality of mind made him a stimulating colleague, and to his students he was as gracious as he was inspiring. ... Robertson's main service to science was in the realm of ideas. His practical work was of lesser significance, but in almost every direction in which his imagination led him he either contributed new conceptions or reoriented prevailing ideas."
Hardolph Wasteneys, Professor of Biochemistry at the University of Toronto, The Biochemical Journal.

- A memorial collection of 12 Robertson items — comprised of ten of his previously published articles and the text of two of his speeches — with an introduction (SP.3) by his University of Adelaide colleague, Stuart Wortley Pennycuick (1887–1966) D.Sc., B.Sc., and edited by his wife (Jane Winifred Robertson), The Spirit of Research (BR.68), was published in 1931.
- On 5 September 1931, in the university's Animal Nutrition Building, Sir George Murray, the Chancellor of the University of Adelaide unveiled a bas-relief commemorative plaque (UA.3), designed and executed by Arthur Murch, that was dedicated to Robertson's memory.
- A memorial collection of scientific papers contributed by former pupils and colleagues of Robertson, edited by Sir Charles James Martin and Hedley R. Marston, was published in January 1932 as a special issue of The Australian Journal of Experimental Biology and Medical Science.
- A memorial window, commissioned by his wife — designed and produced by Edith Lungley, a member of the British Society of Master Glass Painters — was presented to the University of Adelaide, and was unveiled in the Mitchell Building at a ceremony on 18 March 1932 by Sir George Murray, the university's Chancellor.
- The Medical Sciences Club of South Australia sponsored the annual Brailsford Robertson Memorial Lecture in Robertson's memory. Notable lecturers have been: Sir Howard Florey (1944), Edward Slater (1957), Frank Dickens (1959), Frank G. Young (1960), Derek Denny-Brown (1964), M.F.A. Woodruff (1965), Stephen Boyden (1968), Geoffrey Burnstock (1971), Frank Macfarlane Burnet (1976), and John B. West (1978).
- In 2001, the Brailsford Robertson Award was jointly created by the Commonwealth Scientific and Industrial Research Organisation (CSIRO) and the University of Adelaide specifically to encourage collaborative research in areas of health identified as strategic priorities by the CSIRO Food and Nutritional Sciences division and the University of Adelaide.
- In 2001, the former CSIRO Division of Animal Nutrition Building on the University of Adelaide's campus was re-named the Brailsford Robertson Building.

== See also ==
- Photographs
- Robertson, aged 18, Glenelg, 1902. Collection of the State Library of South Australia.
- Robertson and his mother, Berkeley, California, 1907. Collection of the State Library of South Australia.
- Robertson, laboratory of the Physiology Department at the University of California, Berkeley, 1912. Collection of the State Library of South Australia.
- Robertson's father, London, 1914. Collection of the State Library of South Australia.
- Robertson with his infant daughter, Berkeley, California, 1917. Collection of the State Library of South Australia.
- Thorburn Brailsford Robertson Memorial Window, Mitchell Building, University of Adelaide.

- Animal nutrition – Science of nutrition for animals
- Animal testing – Use of animals in experiments
- Autocatalysis – Chemical reaction whose product is also its catalyst
- Bioassay – Analytical method to determine potency and effect of a substance
- Biological patent – Patent on an invention in the field of biology
- Biological patents in the United States – Type of patents in the United States
- Chemical purity – Measure of the amount of impurities in a chemical sample
- Commonwealth Scientific and Industrial Research Organisation (CSIRO) – Federal government agency for scientific research in Australia
- Connaught Medical Research Laboratories at University of Toronto (early development of "insulin")
- Diabetic hypoglycemia ("Insulin shock") – Low blood glucose level occurring in person with diabetes mellitus
- Diabetes insipidus – Condition characterized by large amounts of dilute urine and increased thirst
- Diabetes medication – Drugs that lower blood glucose levels to treat diabetes
- Diabetes mellitus – Group of endocrine diseases characterized by high blood sugar levels
- Dose – Measured quantity of a medicine, nutrient, or pathogen which is delivered as a unit
- Drug discovery – Pharmaceutical discovery procedure
- Effective dose (ED) – Dose or concentration of a drug which induces a biological response
- Endogenous factors – Substances & processes originating within an organism, tissue, or cell
- Exogenous factors – Fact of an action or object originating externally
- Funding of science
- Gerontology – Study of the biological, psychological, and social aspects of aging
- History of patent law – Legal protection of rights in an invention
- Insulin analogue – Modified forms of synthetic insulin
- Insulin (medication) – Use of insulin protein and analogs as medical treatment
- Intellectual property (IP) – Ownership of creative expressions and processes
- Lethal dose (LD) – Sufficient amount to kill
- Knowledge-based economy – Approach to generating value
- Knowledge intensive services (KIS) – Activities aimed at the practical use of knowledge
- Knowledge translation (KT) – Moving scientific research into practical use
- Medication costs – Common health care cost
- Pasteur's quadrant – Classification of scientific research projects
- Pharmacodynamics (PD) – Branch of pharmacology that studies how a drug affects an organism
- Pharmacokinetics (PK) – Branch of pharmacology that studies how an organism affects a drug
- Potency – Measure of drug activity
- Public good – Good that is non-excludable and non-rival
- Recombinant DNA – DNA molecules formed by human agency at a molecular level generating novel DNA sequences
- Research university – University committed to research
- Route of administration – Path by which a drug, fluid, poison, or other substance is taken into the body
- Senescence – Deterioration of function with age
- Technology transfer (TT)/Transfer of technology (TOT) – Process of disseminating technology
- Therapeutic index (TI) – Quantitative measurement of the relative safety of a drug
- Toxic dose (TD) – Dose dependant harmfulness of substances
- The Australian Journal of Experimental Biology and Medical Science
- Translational medicine ("bench-to-bedside") – Conversion to apply basic biomedical science to clinical practice
- University charter – Document to create or recognize a university
- Vocational university – Degree-granting applied professional education institution
- Xenobiotic – Foreign chemical substance found within an organism
- Xenotransplantation – Transplantation of cells or tissue across species
