= George Ludwig Zuelzer =

German physician of Jewish ancestry

George Ludwig Zuelzer (German spelling: Georg Ludwig Zülzer; April 10, 1870 – October 16, 1949) was a German physician of Jewish ancestry who was a native of Berlin. He practiced medicine in Berlin until the Nazi party took power, when he emigrated 1934 to New York City. His son, Wolf William Zuelzer (1909–1987), was a noted American hematologist and pediatrician.

Zülzer is remembered for his work with diabetes mellitus. He had some success using pancreatic extracts on diabetic dogs, and in 1906 injected an extract called "Acomatol" into a dying diabetic patient who was in a coma. At first the patient showed improvement, but later suffered from side effects, and died when the Acomatol supply was exhausted. Acomatol was based on an extract from calf pancreases, and was manufactured by a local company in Berlin.

In a total of seven patients he observed a marked reduction of glucose and acetone in the urine. However, most patients suffered from severe side effects developing high fevers. He published those results in 1908.

Afterwards, Zülzer continued to seek a suitable remedy for diabetes mellitus. With the help of the company Hoffmann-La Roche, a better purification of his pancreas extracts was achieved, and in 1914 he injected diabetic dogs who developed convulsions and died. This was most likely due to an overdose of what later became known as insulin and resulting hypoglycemia. Zülzer, however, did not realize this and believed the problem to be caused by still insufficient purity of the preparation. His laboratory was turned over to the German military during World War I.

A breakthrough occurred in the early 1920s when Canadian physicians Frederick Banting and Charles Best developed an extract that saved the life of a 13-year-old diabetic patient, Leonard Thompson.

== Sources ==
- This article is based on a translation of an article from the German Wikipedia.
