= Wolf W. Zuelzer =

German pediatrician (1909–1987)

- Born: Wolf William Zuelzer; May 25, 1909; Berlin, Kingdom of Prussia, German Empire
- Died: March 20, 1987 (aged 77)
- Education: Heidelberg University; University of Bonn; Charles University
- Scientific career
- Fields: Pathology
- Institutions: Children's Hospital of Michigan; Wayne State University faculty

Wolf William Zuelzer (Note: He was born Wolf William Zülzer, but after moving to the United States he spelled his surname without an umlaut, as Zuelzer.) (May 24, 1909 – March 20, 1987) was a German-American pediatric pathologist. He worked at the Children's Hospital of Michigan for 35 years, where he oversaw a large amount of pediatric research, particularly in the field of hematology. He received the John Howland Award in 1985.

== Early life ==
Zuelzer was born in Berlin in 1909 to George and Edith Zuelzer. His father was a physician who pioneered anti-diabetic therapies and came from a strongly medical family. His mother, meanwhile, was a pianist whose parents were also accomplished musicians. After graduating from gymnasium he studied philosophy and Romance languages at Heidelberg University. In 1928, he was selected to undertake a fellowship at the University of Paris, where he became fluent in French and was introduced to French literature. He returned to Germany in 1929 and began a doctorate in French literature, but six months before he was due to complete his PhD, he decided to study medicine instead. He completed his preclinical studies at the University of Bonn and moved to Berlin in 1932 to finish his clinical training. When Hitler came to power, however, Zuelzer decided to leave Nazi Germany to finish his medical studies at the German University in Prague, graduating in 1935.

== Career ==
Zuelzer migrated to the United States in August 1935. After working briefly at the Cambridge City Hospital in Cambridge, Massachusetts, he was appointed a house officer in the pediatric department of the Massachusetts General Hospital. In 1938, he began volunteering at the Boston Children's Hospital with Sidney Farber, the country's first pediatric pathologist. He was a resident pathologist at Children's Memorial Hospital in Chicago for two-and-a-half years before moving to Detroit to take up a position that was created specifically for him, as a professor of pediatric research at Wayne State University and director of the laboratories at the Children's Hospital of Michigan. He was a temporary chairman of the hospital's pediatric department in 1946 and was appointed director of the Child Research Center of Michigan in 1955. He worked at the Child Research Center and Children's Hospital of Michigan for 35 years; during that time, he oversaw research in numerous fields of pediatrics and published over 250 research articles. Zuelzer's research was particularly influential in the field of hematology, particularly regarding hemoglobinopathies such as thalassemias and sickle cell anemia. He and Gene Kaplan were the first to describe ABO hemolytic disease of the newborn, and Zuelzer published one of the first studies to show that acute leukemias in childhood could be cured by chemotherapy. He received the 1948 E. Mead Johnson Award for his research into megaloblastic anemia in infants.

In 1975, Zuelzer resigned from the Children's Hospital of Michigan and moved to Silver Spring, Maryland, to take up a position at the National Heart, Lung, and Blood Institute as the institute's associate director and the director of blood resources. In his later career, he also published numerous non-medical works, including a biography of the German physiologist Georg Friedrich Nicolai, numerous articles in the German intellectual magazine Merkur, and a historical account of the Watergate scandal. In 1985 he was awarded the John Howland Award, the highest honor given by the American Pediatric Society.

== Death ==
Zuelzer died of leukemia on March 20, 1987, aged 77, at George Washington University Hospital, in Washington, D.C.
