= Charles Best House =

Historic house in Maine, United States

- U.S. National Register of Historic Places
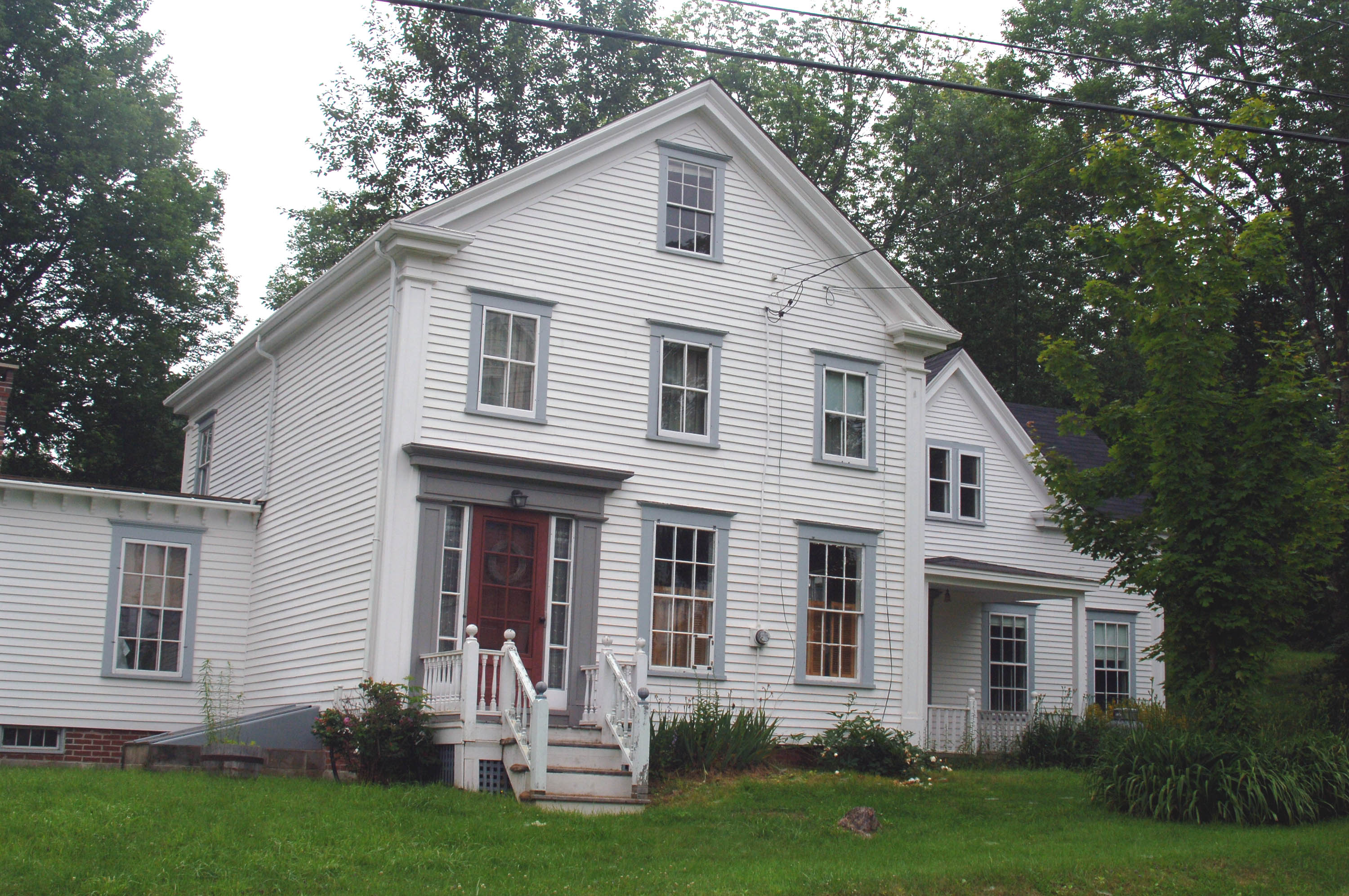
- Best House, 2006

- Location within Maine Location within the United States
- Location: Old County Rd., West Pembroke, Maine
- Coordinates: 44°56′51″N 67°10′30″W
- Area: 0.5 acres (0.20 ha)
- Built: 1845
- Architectural style: Greek Revival
- NRHP reference No.: 82000784
- Added to NRHP: March 2, 1982

The Charles Best House is a historic house on Old County Road in West Pembroke, Maine, United States. Built in 1845, it is a fairly typical example of a mid-19th century Greek Revival connected farmstead. It is notable as the birthplace in 1899 of Charles Best (1899–1978), who is credited as a co-discoverer of insulin and the development of its therapeutic use in the treatment of diabetes. The house was listed on the National Register of Historic Places in 1982.

== Description and significance ==
The Best House is set on the north side of Old County Road in the village of West Pembroke in Down East Maine. The main portion of the house is a 2 1/2-story wood frame block, three bays wide, with a front-facing gable roof and clapboard siding. The entrance, set in the leftmost bay of the southwest-facing front, is flanked by sidelight windows and topped by an entablature. Southeast of the main block, a 1 1/2-story ell has a secondary entrance with a gable-roof dormer above. A second ell connects this wing to a single-story carriage house and a barn.

The house is estimated to have been built about 1845. In 1899, it was here that Charles Best was born. Best was educated at the University of Toronto, and in 1921 began a fruitful collaboration with Drs. Frederick Banting and John Macleod. On January 11, 1922, Best administered the first dose of insulin to a human subject. Although he did not formally share in the Nobel Prize in Medicine awarded in 1923 to Banting and Macleod, the latter shared his prize money with Best. Best continued his successful research career with the development of several enzyme-based therapies. He died in 1978. His birthplace was purchased in 1959 by the American Diabetes Association, and transferred in 1978 to the National Trust for Historic Preservation, which sold it, with preservation restrictions, into private hands.

== See also ==
- National Register of Historic Places listings in Washington County, Maine
