= Walter Ruggles Campbell =

Canadian physician and diabetologist

Walter Ruggles "Dynamite" Campbell (14 December 1890, Port Robinson, Ontario – 9 July 1981, Toronto) was a Canadian physician and diabetologist, known as the first physician "to administer insulin to a patient."

== Biography ==
Walter R. Campbell's father, Bruce M. Campbell, was born in 1861 and married Jane Mary "Jennie" Ekins in April 1889. Walter was their first-born child and spent his early childhood years on the family farm in Ontario. In the late 1890s, Bruce Campbell took his family, consisting of his wife, sons, Walter and Lancing (1893–1969), and daughter, Pearl (1895–1991), to California and joined Bruce's two older brothers in the construction business, but he died unexpectedly in 1906. The death of her husband led Jennie Campbell to return to Ontario to enable Walter to pursue higher education and eventually attend medical school in Toronto.

At the University of Toronto, Walter R. Campbell graduated with a B.A. in 1911, an M.A. in 1912, an M.B. in 1915 (qualifying him for the practice of medicine), and an M.D. in 1917. During WW I, Campbell served from 1917 to 1919 in the Canadian Army Medical Corps. In 1918 he treated nephritic casualties at the No. 4 Canadian General Hospital at Basingstoke in Hampshire on the coast of the English Channel. In 1919 he joined the staff of the department of medicine of the University of Toronto and the medical service of Toronto General Hospital; in 1948 he was appointed an associate professor at the former and a senior physician at the latter. He qualified F.R.C.P.C. in 1930 and was elected F.R.S.C. in 1933.

In 1922 Leonard Thompson, a teenaged patient with severe diabetes, was admitted to Toronto General Hospital, where Walter Campbell and Andrew Almon Fletcher were physicians working in the diabetes ward under the direction of Duncan Archibald Graham. Thompson was chosen for the first clinical trial of the pancreatic extract of insulin, supplied by Banting, Best, and Macleod.

Campbell had gained the consent of the father to try the new pancreatic extract. When Banting brought over the brownish grey liquid, 7.5 ml of McLeod's serum (which is what it was called in the orders) was injected into each buttock. ...
As often in hospital care, the "hands on" work fell to someone lower in the hierarchy and it was the senior intern, Jeffrey, who actually gave the injection. The seminal paper was published in March 1922 ...

The success of insulin lead to visits to Toronto by a steady stream of prominent diabetologists, including Elliott P. Joslin, Russell Morse Wilder, and Rollin Turner Woodyatt.

Campbell's career thrived in the spotlight of insulin discovery, but his interest in endocrinology also led to a reputation in calcium physiology. He retired from clinical work in 1952 but remained active in his laboratory until 1971. He lived a further ten years until the age of 90.

In 1953 Campbell and Fletcher were both awarded Banting Medals by th American Diabetes Association.

On the 24th of December 1947 he married Elizabeth Frances Goodwin (1917–2001). They had two daughters. His burial took place at Mount Pleasant Cemetery, Toronto.

== Selected publications ==
=== Articles ===
- Hunter, Andrew; Campbell, W. H. (1918). "The amount and the distribution of creatinine and creatine in normal human blood". J. Biol. Chem. 33: 169–191. doi:10.1016/S0021-9258(18)86608-X.
- Banting, F. G.; Best, C. H.; Collip, J. B.; Campbell, W. R.; Fletcher, A. A. (March 1922). "Pancreatic Extracts in the Treatment of Diabetes Mellitus". Canadian Medical Association Journal. 12 (3): 141–146. PMC 1524425. PMID 20314060.
- Banting, F.G.; Best, C.H.; Collip, J.B.; Campbell, W.R.; Fletcher, A.A.; Macleod, J.J.R.; Noble, E.C. (1923). The effect produced on diabetes by extracts of pancreas. University of Toronto Library: Published by the Librarian. (This paper was delivered on 3 May 1922 by Macleod at the Washington, D.C., meeting of the Association of American Physicians. See "The Discovery of Insulin". The Canadian Encyclopedia.)
- Banting, F. G.; Campbell, W. R.; Fletcher, A. A. (1923). "Further Clinical Experience with Insulin (Pancreatic Extracts) in the Treatment of Diabetes Mellitus". British Medical Journal. 1 (3236): 8–12. doi:10.1136/bmj.1.3236.8. PMC 2316395. PMID 20770964.
- Campbell, W. R. (1923). "Dietetic Treatment in Diabetes Mellitus". Canadian Medical Association Journal. 13 (7): 487–492. PMC 1707079. PMID 20314727.
- Campbell, Walter R.; Markowitz, J. (1927). "Preferential Utilization of Carbohydrate in Diabetes 12". Journal of Clinical Investigation. 4 (1): 37–52. doi:10.1172/JCI100112. PMC 434657. PMID 16693747.
- Campbell, Walter R.; Markowitz, J. (1927). "On the Metabolism of Dihydroxyacetone in Pancreatic Diabetes". American Journal of Physiology. Legacy Content. 80 (3): 561–575. doi:10.1152/ajplegacy.1927.80.3.561.
- Howland, Goldwin; Campbell, Walter R.; Maltby, Ernest J. (1929). "Dysinsulinism". Journal of the American Medical Association. 93 (9): 674. doi:10.1001/jama.1929.02710090014006.
- Campbell, W. R. (1930). "The Indications for the Use of Insulin". Canadian Medical Association Journal. 22 (2): 188–192. PMC 381697. PMID 20317685.
- Kerr, R. B.; Best, C. H.; Campbell, W. R.; Fletcher, A. A. (1936). "Protamine Insulin". Canadian Medical Association Journal. 34 (4): 400–401. PMC 1561605. PMID 20320225.
- Campbell, Walter R.; Hanna, Marion I. (1937). "The Albumin, Globulins, and Fibrinogen of Serum and Plasma". Journal of Biological Chemistry. 119: 15–33. doi:10.1016/s0021-9258(18)74428-1.
- Campbell, W. R. (1943). "Thyrotoxicosis and its Treatment". Canadian Medical Association Journal. 48 (2): 110–113. PMC 1827646. PMID 20322684.
- Campbell, W. R.; Hanna, M. I. (1944). "Clinical Estimation of Protein in the Cerebrospinal Fluid". Canadian Medical Association Journal. 51 (4): 347–350. PMC 1581895. PMID 20323229.
- Dauphinee, James A.; Campbell, W.R. (1948). "Serum Proteins in Hepatic Disease". Medical Clinics of North America. 32 (2): 455–468. doi:10.1016/S0025-7125(16)35718-2. PMID 18902885.
- Banting, F. G.; Best, C. H.; Collip, J. B.; Campbell, W. R.; Fletcher, A. A. (1956). "Pancreatic Extracts in the Treatment of Diabetes Mellitus". Diabetes. 5: 69–71. doi:10.2337/diab.5.1.69. S2CID 22547673.
- Campbell, W. R. (1962). "Anabasis". Canadian Medical Association Journal. 87 (20): 1055–1061. PMC 1849794. PMID 14018155.

=== Books ===
- Macleod, John James Rickard; Campbell, Walter Ruggles (1925). Insulin; Its Use in the Treatment of Diabetes. Williams & Wilkins.
