= E. B. Babcock =

American plant geneticist (1877–1954)

Ernest Brown Babcock
- Born: July 10, 1877; Edgerton, Wisconsin, United States
- Died: December 8, 1954 (aged 77)
- Known for: Genetic and evolutionary studies of the genus Crepis
- Scientific career
- Fields: Botany, plant genetics
- Workplaces: University of California, Berkeley
- Doctoral students: Marion Elizabeth Stilwell Cave
- Author abbrev. (botany): Babc.

Ernest Brown Babcock (July 10, 1877 – December 8, 1954) was an American plant geneticist and botanist at the University of California, Berkeley. He was a pioneer in applying genetic and cytological approaches to the study of plant evolution and is best known for his extensive research program on the genus Crepis, which became an important model system for evolutionary genetics and cytogenetics in plants.

He was among the early leaders in integrating genetics, cytology, and systematics to understand plant evolution and speciation.

== Early life and education ==
Babcock was born in Edgerton, Wisconsin, the son of Emilius Welcome Babcock and Mary Eliza Brown. His early interest in plants began while caring for a family conservatory as a teenager, where he developed a fascination with plant variation and breeding.

He attended Lawrence University in Appleton, Wisconsin, where he developed an interest in natural flora during botanical excursions along the Fox River. After moving with his family to California, he attended a teachers' normal school and worked for several years as a grammar-school teacher before entering the University of California.

At Berkeley he studied agriculture and botany, taking as many plant science courses as possible despite the absence of formal instruction in plant breeding at the time. His interest in evolutionary biology was stimulated in part by lectures given at Berkeley by the Dutch geneticist Hugo de Vries, one of the rediscoverers of Mendel's laws.

== Early career in plant breeding ==
After completing his studies, Babcock spent several years teaching agriculture and conducting experiment station work. One of his early research projects involved breeding peaches suitable for southern California, where mild winters often prevented commercial varieties from flowering properly. By crossing a Chinese peach variety adapted to local conditions with established commercial cultivars, he initiated a breeding program that later produced improved varieties adapted to the region.

In 1908 he joined the faculty of the University of California, Berkeley, where he remained for the rest of his career. At Berkeley he investigated plant mutations and variation, including a distinctive oak-leaf form of the California black walnut that he demonstrated to be a spontaneous mutation.

== Genetics at Berkeley ==
In 1913 the College of Agriculture reorganized its curriculum under Dean Thomas Forsyth Hunt. Babcock was appointed to develop instruction in plant and animal breeding and subsequently organized the Division of Genetics at Berkeley, one of the earliest academic units devoted to genetics in the United States.

In 1914 he recruited Roy Elwood Clausen as an instructor, beginning a long collaboration. Together they wrote the widely used textbook Genetics in Relation to Agriculture (1918), one of the earliest comprehensive textbooks explaining genetic principles for plant and animal breeding.

== Research on Crepis ==
Babcock is best known for his long-term research program on the genus Crepis, a group of plants related to dandelions. He selected Crepis as a research organism because several species have relatively small chromosome numbers, making them suitable for cytological study and genetic analysis.

Beginning in 1918, Babcock assembled a research team that combined field botany, cytology, genetics, and taxonomy to study the evolutionary relationships among species of Crepis. Early collaborators included J. L. Collins and Margaret Mann, and later a number of prominent cytogeneticists such as Mikhail Sergeevich Navashin, Arne Müntzing, and G. Ledyard Stebbins.

Their work demonstrated that species differentiation in Crepis involved several genetic mechanisms, including gene mutation, structural changes in chromosomes, and polyploidy. These findings helped establish the importance of chromosomal evolution in plant diversification.

Babcock and Navashin published an influential cytogenetic study of the genus in 1930. From his work in Babcock's lab, Navashin described unusual chromosomal variants in Crepis, including one of the earliest documented ring chromosomes in plants.

Over several decades Babcock continued to expand the project, collecting and studying species across the Mediterranean and Eurasia. The research culminated in his two-volume monograph The Genus Crepis (1947), which synthesized taxonomic, cytological, and evolutionary evidence for nearly 200 species and represented one of the first comprehensive genetic analyses of plant evolution at the level of an entire genus.

== Later work and influence ==
Babcock retired from Berkeley in 1947 but continued research and writing. He later collaborated on studies of self-incompatibility in Crepis foetida, identifying a new type of genetic mechanism controlling self-sterility in plants.

He also became involved in efforts to promote the application of genetics to forestry. In the early 1950s he helped organize the Forest Genetics Research Foundation, which sought to strengthen research on genetic improvement of forest trees.

Babcock was elected to the United States National Academy of Sciences in 1946 and served as president of several scientific societies, including the Society for the Study of Evolution.

== Legacy ==
Babcock played an important role in establishing plant genetics and cytogenetics as tools for understanding evolution. His research program on Crepis demonstrated how genetic, cytological, and systematic data could be integrated to reconstruct the evolutionary history of plant groups, an approach that influenced later studies in evolutionary biology and plant systematics.

== Publications ==
- Carey, C.W. 2000. Babcock, Ernest Brown. American National Biography Online. Oxford University Press
