= Roy Elwood Clausen =

American biologist (1891–1956)

- Born: August 21, 1891; Randall, Iowa
- Died: August 21, 1956 (aged 65); Berkeley, California
- Education: Oklahoma A&M; UC Berkeley (PhD, 1914)
- Known for: Genetics in Relation to Agriculture (with Ernest B. Babcock, 1918)
- Scientific career
- Institutions: UC Berkeley; Los Alamos Laboratory
- Doctoral advisor: Thorburn Brailsford Robertson
- Other academic advisors: William Albert Setchell
- Author abbrev. (botany): R.E.Clausen

Roy Elwood Clausen (August 21, 1891, Randall, Iowa – August 21, 1956, Berkeley, California) was an American biochemist, botanist, plant geneticist, and drosophilist.

== Biography ==
Clausen was the eldest of six siblings. As a boy with his family, he moved from Iowa to Newkirk, Oklahoma, in 1900. In 1910, he graduated with a bachelor of science degree in agriculture from Stillwater's Oklahoma A&M (later renamed Oklahoma State University). In 1910, Clausen matriculated at the University of California, Berkeley. There, Clausen graduated in 1912 with a second bachelor's degree, in agriculture, with a major in plant pathology. He graduated in 1914 with a Ph.D. in biochemistry, with a minor in plant pathology. His thesis advisor was Thorburn Brailsford Robertson. From 1914 until his death in 1956, Clausen was a faculty member at UC Berkeley. During World War I, he was on an eighteen-month leave of absence when he served in the U.S. Army as a supply officer in a depot brigade. During World War II, he was on another leave of absence when he served in 1944 and 1945 as a personnel officer at the Los Alamos Laboratory.

As a graduate assistant of William Albert Setchell, Clausen began investigating the genus Nicotiana and continued this research until he died in 1956. Early in his career, he studied the genetics of Drosophila but eventually concentrated on the genetics of Nicotiana and gave his Drosophila stocks to the geneticist Walter Poppino Spencer (1898–1969). For about twenty years, up to 1926, Clausen collaborated with Thomas Harper Goodspeed. From an analysis of chromosome pairing in hybrids of Nicotania species, Clausen and Goodspeed were the first to provide empirical evidence for Winge's hypothesis of plant hybridization following chromosome doubling. After 1934, Clausen collaborated extensively with Donald Ross Cameron (1907–1984).

Clausen's pioneering studies on unbalanced chromosomal types—haploids, trisomics, monosomic—culminated in the recognition of a complete set of twenty-four monosomics in N. tabacum. However, he was not content merely to isolate and describe the monosomics, but through their use to develop a powerful new tool of genetic analysis. He demonstrated how monosomic analysis makes it possible to study, chromosome by chromosome, the genetic differences between the cultivated species N. tabacum, a natural amphidiploid (doubled hybrid), and a series of raw amphidiploids synthesized by doubling the chromosomes of sterile hybrids between putative ancestral species.

With Ernest B. Babcock, Clausen wrote Genetics in Relation to Agriculture (1918), with a second edition in 1927. After his return from Los Alamos, he served as the chair of UC Berkeley's department of genetics.

Clausen was elected a member of the National Academy of Sciences in 1951. He was the president of the Genetics Society of America in 1953.

He married Mae Winifred Falls in 1916. He died from a heart attack in 1956, and his widow died in 1959.

== Selected publications ==
- Babcock, Ernest Brown & Clausen, Roy Elwood (1918), Genetics in Relation to Agriculture, New York: McGraw-Hill Book Company.
- Clausen, R. E.; Mann, M. C. (1924). "Inheritance in Nicotiana tabacum: V. The Occurrence of Haploid Plants in Interspecific Progenies". Proceedings of the National Academy of Sciences. 10 (4): 121–124. Bibcode:1924PNAS...10..121C. doi:10.1073/pnas.10.4.121. PMC 1085570. PMID 16576797.
- Clausen, R. E.; Goodspeed, T. H. (1925). "Interspecific Hybridization in Nicotiana. II. A Tetraploid GLUTINOSA-TABACUM Hybrid, an Experimental Verification of Winge's Hypothesis". Genetics. 10 (3): 278–284. doi:10.1093/genetics/10.3.278. PMC 1200860. PMID 17246274.
- Clausen, Roy Elwood (1941). "Polyploidy in Nicotiana". The American Naturalist. 75 (759): 291–306. doi:10.1086/280965. S2CID 84202696.
- Clausen, R. E.; Cameron, D. R. (1944). "Inheritance in Nicotiana tabacum. Xviii. Monosomic Analysis". Genetics. 29 (5): 447–477. doi:10.1093/genetics/29.5.447. PMC 1209259. PMID 17247133.
- Clausen, R. E.; Cameron, D. R. (1950). "Inheritance in Nicotiana tabacum: Xxiii. Duplicate Factors for Chlorophyll Production". Genetics. 35 (1): 4–10. doi:10.1093/genetics/35.1.4. PMC 1209471. PMID 15399616.
- Clausen, R. E.; Cameron, D. R. (1957). "Inheritance in Nicotiana tabacum. XXVIII. The cytogenetics of introgression". Proceedings of the National Academy of Sciences. 43 (10): 908–913. Bibcode:1957PNAS...43..908C. doi:10.1073/pnas.43.10.908. ISSN 0027-8424. PMC 528549. PMID 16590107.
