= Aron Rappaport =

Czech-Canadian pathologist

Aron Moses Rappaport (1904–1992) was a Czech-Canadian pathologist and physiologist recognized for his pioneering work in liver microanatomy. He is best known for refining the hepatic acinus model, which provided a functional classification of liver tissue based on blood supply and metabolic activity. His research significantly advanced the understanding of liver circulation and its implications for disease processes.

== Early life and education ==
Aron Moses Rappaport was born in Siret, Bukovina, in Austria-Hungary in 1904. He graduated in medicine in 1929 from the German University of Prague and subsequently trained in surgery in Germany and France. During World War II, he practiced medicine in Romania. In 1948, he emigrated to Canada, where he worked as a research assistant to Charles Best, co-discoverer of insulin. His interest in experimental cardiovascular surgery led him to study the liver's microcirculation, earning a PhD in 1952.

== Academic career ==
Rappaport was appointed Professor of Physiology at the University of Toronto in 1955. He spent the majority of his academic career at the University of Toronto, where he was a leading researcher in hepatic circulation, portal hypertension, and liver fibrosis. Even after his retirement, he continued working as a Senior Research Scientist at Sunnybrook Health Sciences Centre. In 1990, the Microcirculation Research Laboratory at Sunnybrook (formerly Sunnybrook Hospital) was named in his honor, though it no longer exists.

== Research ==
Rappaport's most significant contribution to hepatology is the hepatic acinus model, which he reintroduced as an improvement upon earlier concepts first described by Marcello Malpighi in 1666. His model classifies the liver parenchyma into functional units based on their proximity to the blood supply from the portal triad:

- Zone 1 (periportal zone): Receives the most oxygenated blood and is primarily responsible for oxidative metabolism and gluconeogenesis.
- Zone 2 (intermediate zone): Has an intermediate level of oxygenation and metabolic activity.
- Zone 3 (perivenous zone): Receives the least oxygenated blood, making it more susceptible to ischemic damage and toxic injury.

Rappaport's model emphasized the presence of six acinar units per hexagonal lobule, arranged around a central portal tract containing branches of the portal vein (PV), hepatic artery (HA), and bile duct (BD). He introduced the concept of “nodal points of Mall”, referring to areas where opposing portal and hepatic vessels terminate into capillaries. His ink-injection studies provided visual evidence of how these microcirculatory units interact.
