= Andrew Almon Fletcher =

Canadian physician

Andrew Almon Fletcher (8 March 1889, Kingston, Ontario – 30 November 1964, Toronto) was a Canadian physician and pioneering diabetologist, known as one of the five co-authors of the famous 1922 paper Pancreatic Extracts in the Treatment of Diabetes Mellitus.

== Biography ==
A. Almon Fletcher graduated in 1913 from the University of Toronto with an M.B. (qualifying him for the practice of medicine). From 1915 to 1918 he served overseas in the Canadian Army Medical Corps. After WW I, he became a staff member of the department of medicine of the University of Toronto and of the medical service of Toronto General Hospital. He qualified F.R.C.P.C. in 1930. He was an assistant professor in the department of medicine of the University of Toronto and a senior physician at Toronto General Hospital from 1922 to 1951 when he retired from Toronto General Hospital. In 1951 he was put in charge of the clinical investigation unit at Toronto's Sunnybrook Military Hospital, which in 1973 became Sunnybrook Medical Centre.

At Toronto General Hospital, in the diabetes ward under the direction of Duncan Archibald Graham, the physicians A. Almon Fletcher and Walter R. Campbell were responsible for the treatment of Leonard Thompson, a teenaged charity case with a severe case of type 1 diabetes, who had been transferred on 2 December 1921 from Toronto's Hospital for Sick Children. Dr. Campbell persuaded Leonard Thompson's father to consent to the experimental test on his son of the pancreatic extract supplied by Banting, Best, and Macleod. The historic injection of insulin took place on 11 January 1922.

In 1953 Fletcher and Campbell were both awarded Banting Medals by the American Diabetes Association.

On 21 September 1921 in Toronto, A. Almon Fletcher married Helen Waterston Mowat (1895–1945), granddaughter of Sir Oliver Mowat. They had four daughters.

His burial took place at Mount Pleasant Cemetery, Toronto.
