= Patricia Brubaker =

Canadian physiologist

- Born: 1957 (age 68–69); Quebec
- Spouse: Stephen Poulin

Academic background
- Education: BSc, PhD, McGill University
- Thesis: Pituitary peptides: isolation and biological function (1982)

Patricia Lee Brubaker FCAHS FRSC (b. 1957) is a Canadian physiologist. She formally served as a Tier 1 Canada Research Chair in Vascular and Metabolic Biology at University of Toronto. Brubaker and Daniel J. Drucker discovered that Glucagon-like peptide-2 (GLP-2) could be used to treat digestive disorders.

== Early life and education ==
Brubaker was born in 1957. While she focused on general science in high school, Brubaker narrowed her interests to organic chemistry after being mentored by Joe Schwarcz in CEGEP. While a PhD student at McGill University, Brubaker was diagnosed with type 1 diabetes. Following her PhD, Brubaker completed post-doctoral work at the University of Toronto (U of T). She worked under the supervision of Mladen Vranic in the Department of Physiology for three years.

== Career ==
Upon completing her postdoctoral work, Brubaker was brought onto the faculty at U of T by Harold Atwood. In 1998, Brubaker received Diabetes Canada's Early Career Researcher Partnership Award. Brubaker received a Canada Research Chair (CRC) in Vascular and Metabolic Biology in 2000. Her CRC was renewed for the final time in 2015. The following year, she was elected a Fellow of the Royal Society of Canada in recognition of her "lifetime’s work spent investigating intestinal peptide hormones and how they help the body repair itself." In 2020, Brubaker became the first woman to receive the Diabetes Canada Lifetime Achievement Award. In 2023, Brubaker was elected a Fellow of the Canadian Academy of Health Sciences.

== Personal life ==
Brubaker and her husband, Stephen Poulin, climbed Mount Kilimanjaro in 2006.
