= Leonard Thompson (diabetic) =

First person to receive an insulin injection

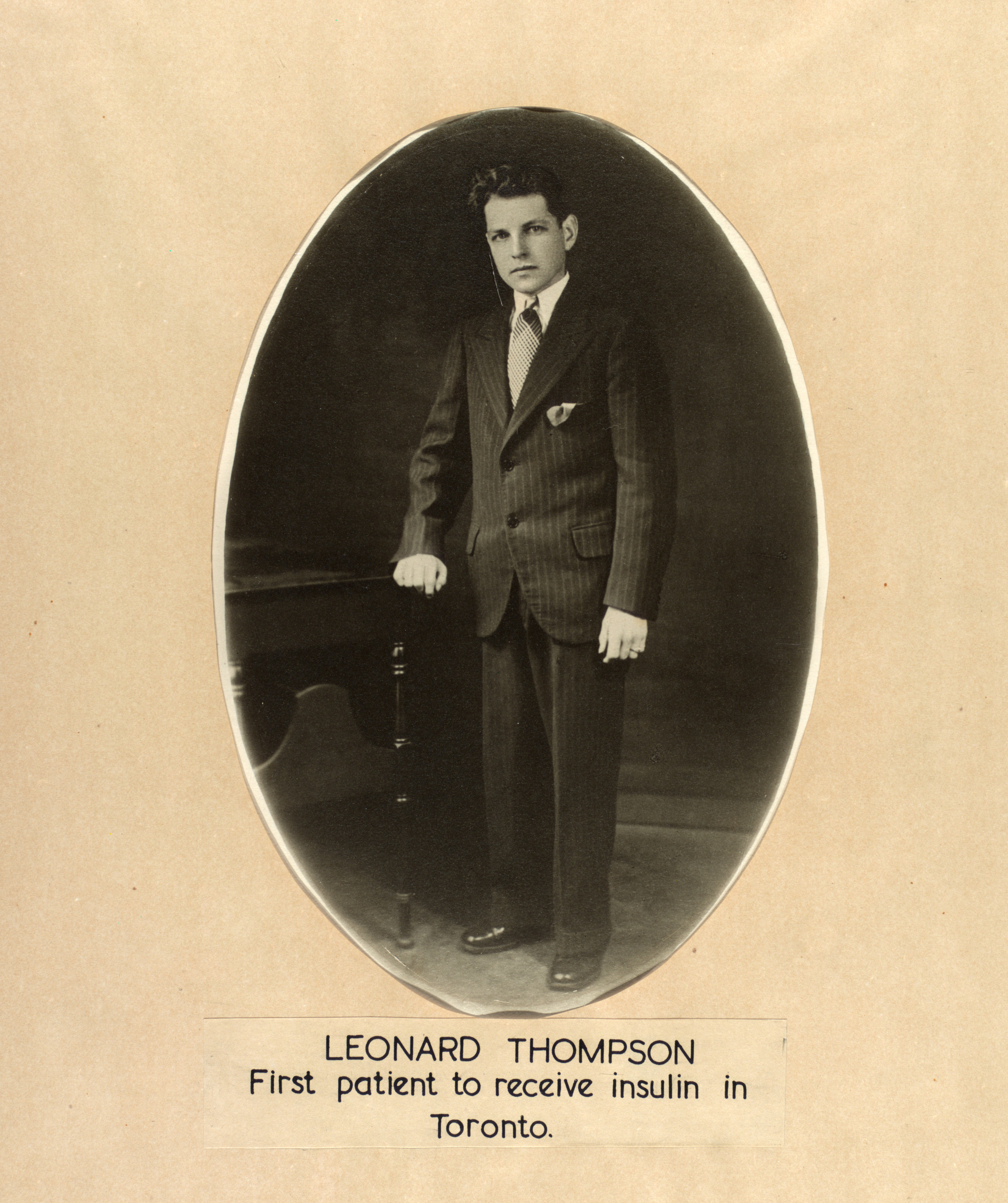
Leonard Thompson c. 1930

Leonard Thompson (17 July 1908 – 20 April 1935) was the first person to have received an injection of insulin as a treatment for type 1 diabetes.

== Biography ==
Leonard Thompson was born on Pickering Street near the Beaches neighbourhood of Toronto on 17 July 1908, to parents Harold and Florence Thompson. He was diagnosed with diabetes mellitus, and was first treated at the Hospital for Sick Children before being transferred to the care of physicians Andrew Almon Fletcher, Duncan Archibald Graham, and Walter Ruggles Campbell.

Thompson received his first injection at Toronto General Hospital on 11 January 1922, at 13 years of age. Thompson's first dose had an apparent impurity which caused an allergic reaction. A refined process was quickly developed to concentrate the pancreatic extract. Twelve days later, on 23 January, he began a two-week series of daily injections that rapidly improved his health, allowing him to live until dying of bronchopneumonia at age 26.

Until insulin was made clinically available, a diagnosis of diabetes was a death sentence, more or less quickly (usually within months, and frequently within weeks or days).

== See also ==
- Gladys Boyd, paediatrician, pioneer in the treatment of juvenile diabetes.
- Charles Best, co-discoverer of insulin.
- Elizabeth Hughes Gossett, a notable early recipient of insulin.
- Frederick Banting, co-discoverer of insulin.
- Islets of Langerhans
- Pancreas
- James D. Havens, first American to receive insulin from Toronto.
