= Charles Best (medical scientist) =

Canadian co-discoverer of insulin (1899–1978)

Charles Best CC CH CBE FRS FRSC FRCP
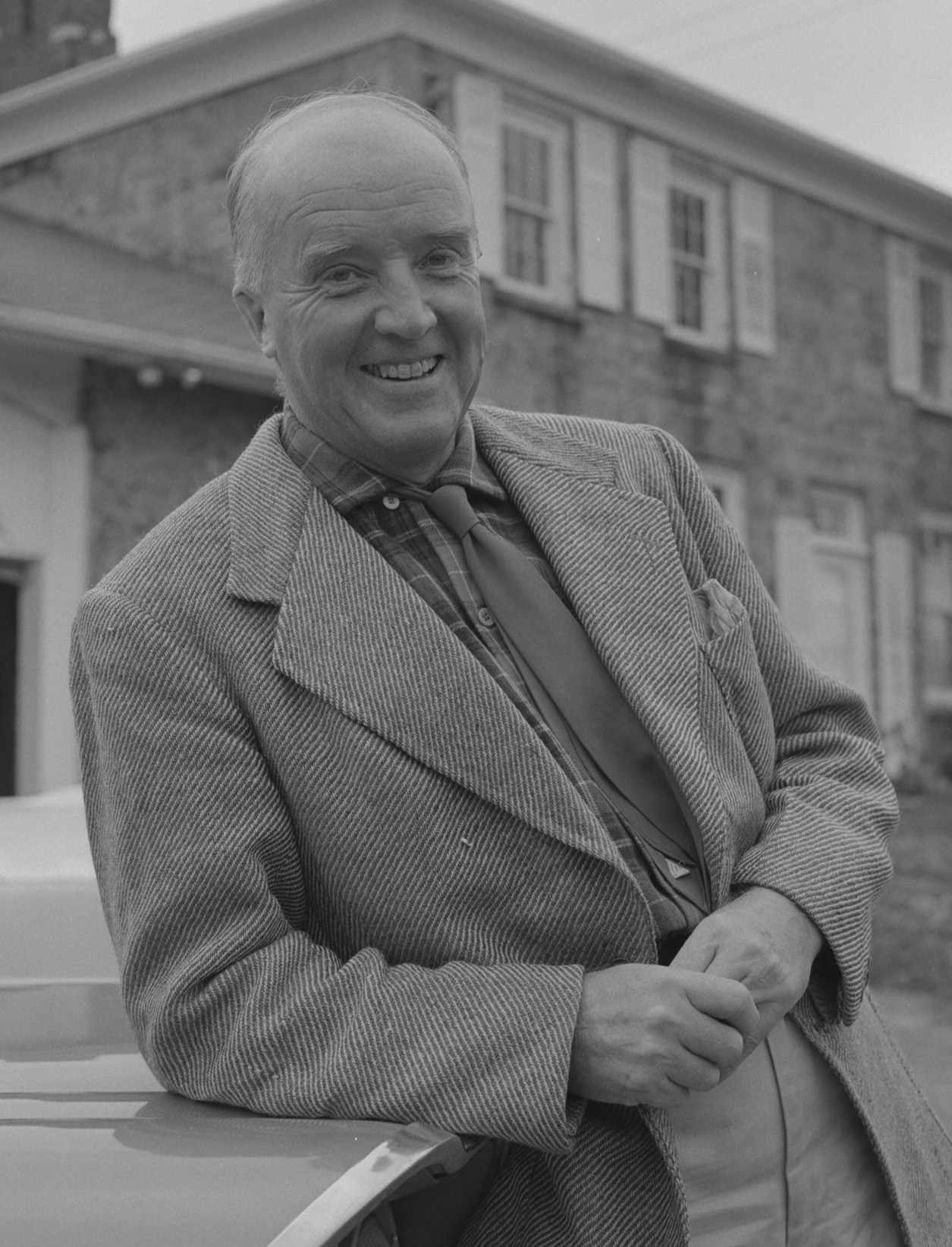
- Best, c. 1959
- Born: February 27, 1899; Pembroke, Maine, U.S.
- Died: March 30, 1978 (aged 79); Toronto, Ontario, Canada
- Education: University of Toronto
- Known for: Co-discoverer of insulin
- Spouse: Margaret Mahon (1900–1988) (m. 1924)
- Children: 2
- Awards: Flavelle Medal (1950); Gairdner Foundation International Award (1971); Order of Canada; Order of the British Empire; Order of the Companions of Honour
- Scientific career
- Fields: Physiology; Biochemistry
- Workplaces: University of Toronto
- Academic advisors: Frederick Banting

Charles Herbert Best (February 27, 1899 – March 31, 1978), was an American-Canadian medical scientist and one of the co-discoverers of insulin with Frederick Banting. He served as the chair of the Banting and Best Department of Medical Research at the University of Toronto and was further involved in research concerning choline and heparin.

== Early life ==
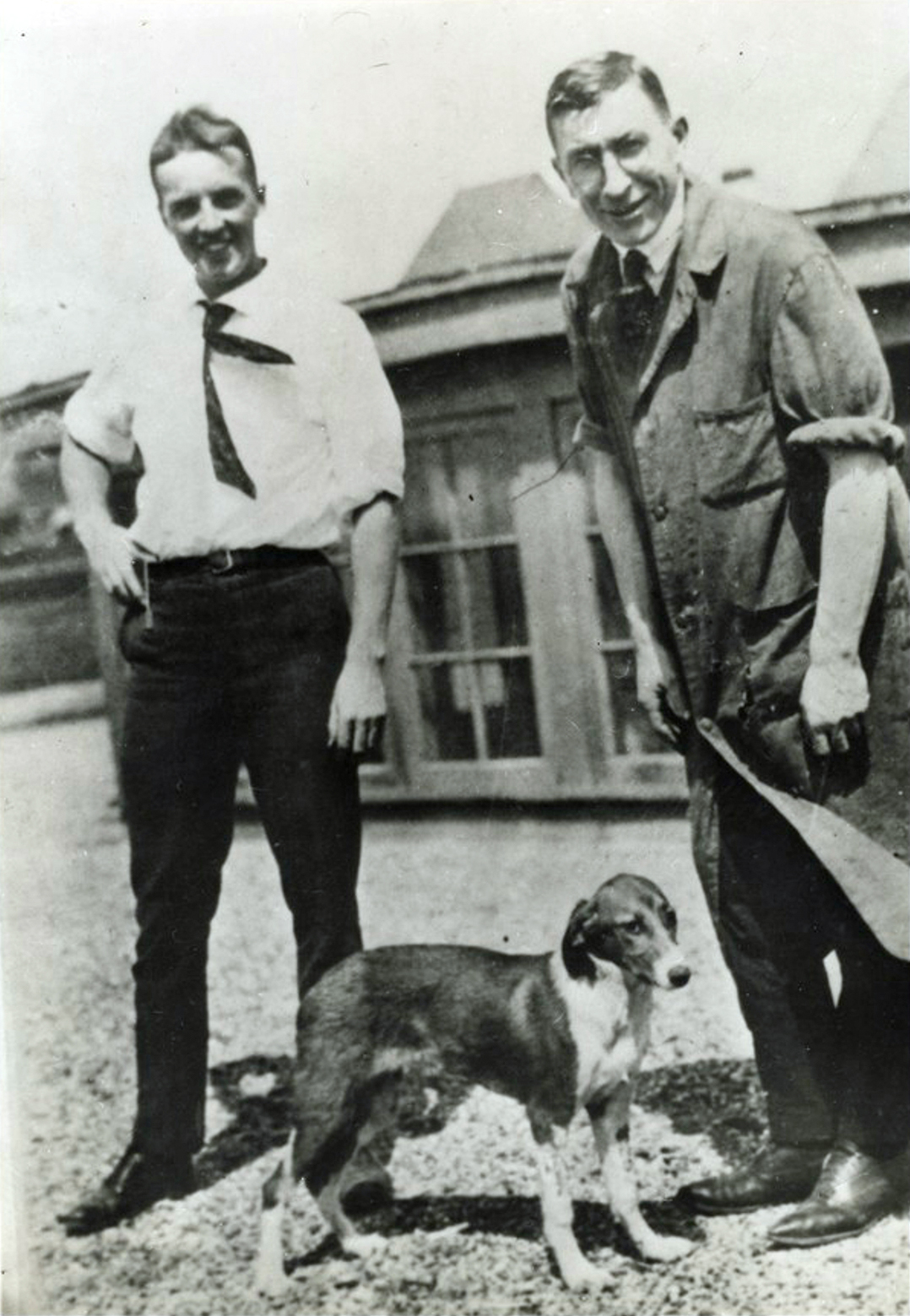
Charles Best and Frederick Banting with Dog 408, one of their experimental animals, Toronto University, August 1921.

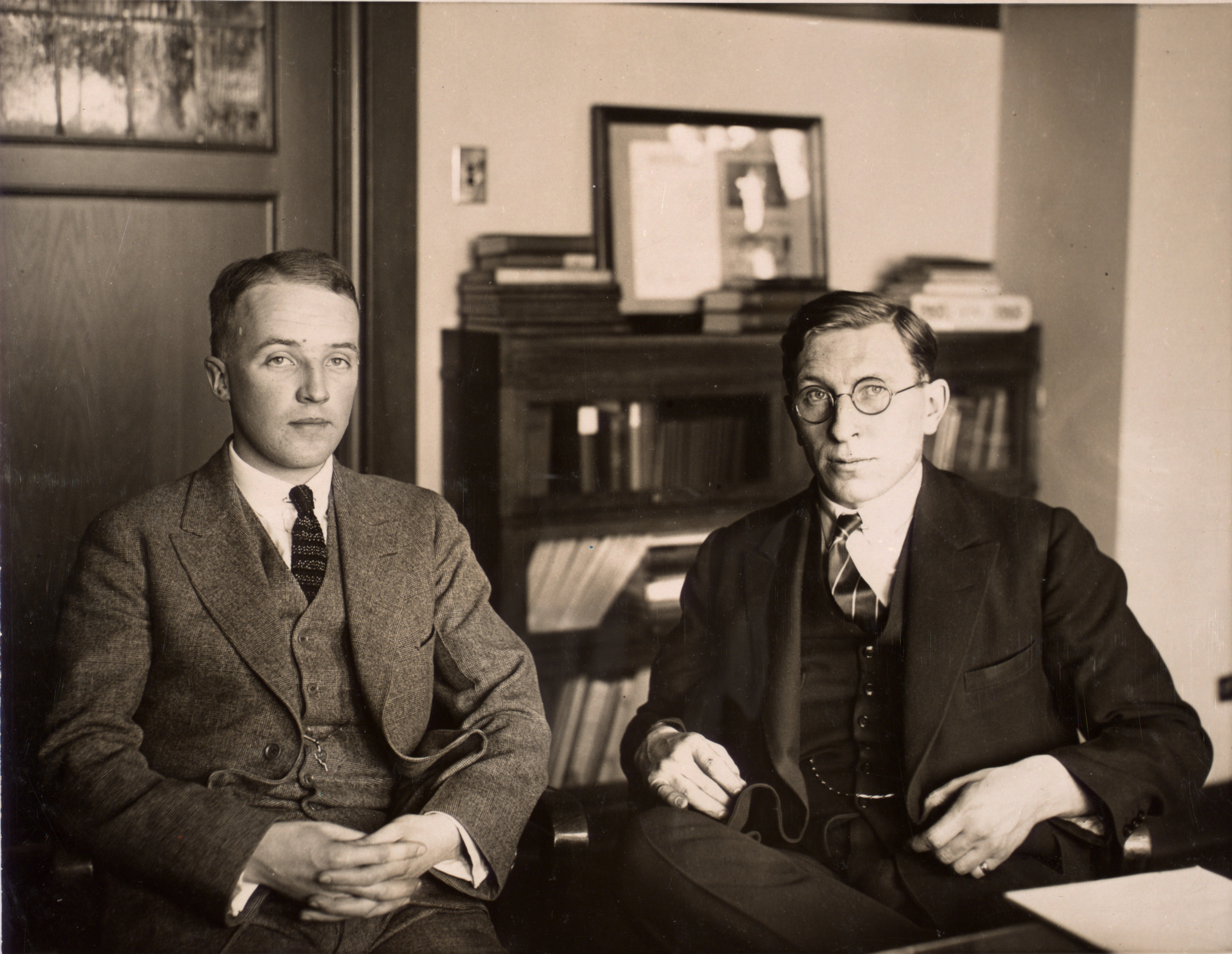
C. H. Best and F. G. Banting c. 1924.

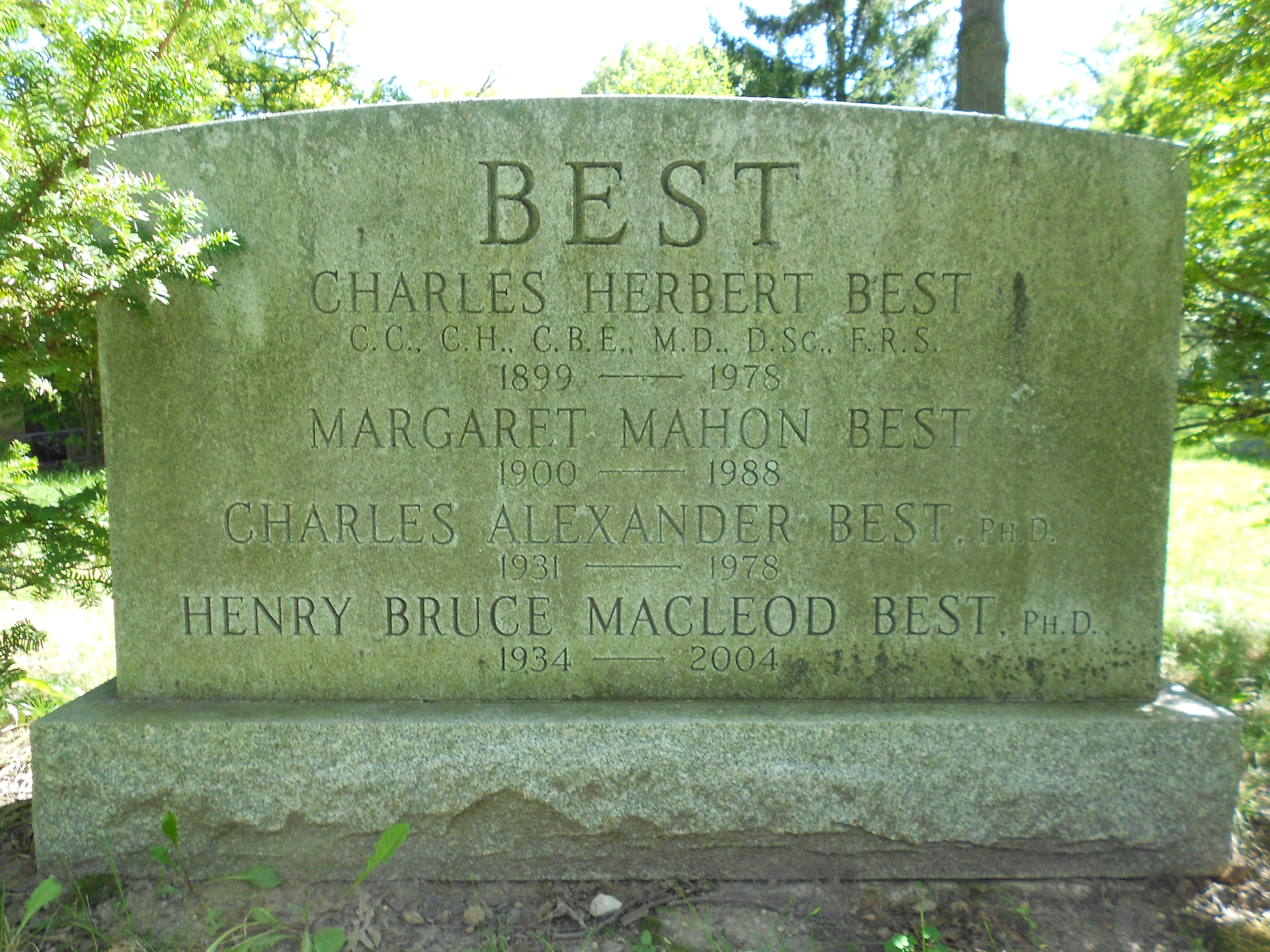
The gravestone of Best (section 29) in Mount Pleasant Cemetery, Toronto.

Charles Herbert Best was born in Pembroke, Maine, on February 27, 1899, to Luella (Lulu) Fisher and Herbert Huestis Best, a Canadian-born physician from Nova Scotia. His father, Herbert Best, was a doctor in a small Maine town with a limited economy based mostly on sardine-packing. His mother Lulu was a soprano singer, organist, and pianist. Charles Best grew up in Pembroke before going to Toronto, Ontario, to study medicine in 1915.

By the time Best had reached college age and was choosing between such schools as McGill University and the University of Toronto, family connections persuaded him to pursue his studies in Toronto. Family illness had guided Best's research interests—his Aunt Anna dying of diabetes had profound effects on him. It was for this reason, and the fact that his father was a physician, that he chose to study at University of Toronto and train to become a doctor. His university studies were interrupted following his first year by the onset of the First World War. He served as an infantry soldier, reaching the rank of acting Sergeant Major. Following his service, he eventually returned to university in Toronto, but was falling behind in his classes.

== Co-discovery of insulin ==
Best moved in 1915 to Toronto, Ontario, where he started studying towards a bachelor of arts degree at University College, University of Toronto. In 1918, he enlisted in the Canadian Army serving with the 2nd Canadian Tank Battalion. After the war, he completed his degree in physiology and biochemistry.

As a 22-year-old medical student at the University of Toronto he worked as an assistant to the surgeon Dr. Frederick Banting and contributed to the discovery of the pancreatic hormone insulin, which led to an effective treatment for diabetes. In the spring of 1921, Banting travelled to Toronto to visit John Macleod, professor of physiology at the University of Toronto, and asked Macleod if he could use his laboratory to isolate pancreatic extracts from dogs. Macleod was initially sceptical, but eventually agreed before leaving on holiday for the summer. Before leaving for Scotland he supplied Banting with ten dogs for experiment and two medical students, Charles Best and Edward Clark Noble, as lab assistants.

It was reported that Best and Noble flipped a coin to see who would assist Banting during the first period of four weeks. According to Best, however, this was the product of a journalist’s imagination, or "newspaper fiction". Nonetheless, Frederick Banting is known to have mentioned this story when discussing the discovery of insulin.

MacLeod was overseeing the work of Banting, who had no experience in physiology, and his assistant Best. In December 1921, when Banting and Best were having difficulties in refining the pancreatic extract and monitoring glucose levels, MacLeod assigned the biochemist James Collip to the team. In January 1922, while Collip was working on insulin purification, Best and Banting administered prematurely their pancreatic extracts to 14-year-old Leonard Thompson, who suffered a severe allergic reaction. Eventually, Collip succeeded in preparing insulin in a more pure, usable form. Banting, Best and Collip shared the patent for insulin, which they sold to the University of Toronto for one dollar.

In 1923, the Nobel Prize Committee honoured Banting and John Macleod with the Nobel Prize in Medicine for the discovery of insulin, ignoring Best and Collip. Banting chose to share half of the prize money with Best. The key contribution by Collip was recognised in the Nobel speech of MacLeod, who also gave one-half of his prize money to Collip. However, "if Banting was hoping that this might offer Best some consolation for not having shared in the prize, he was mistaken. Best’s resentment at having been overlooked began to irritate Banting", to the point that Banting stated in 1941 "If I don’t come back and they give my [Professorial] Chair to that son-of-a-bitch Best, I’ll never rest in my grave", shortly before Banting boarded a plane for the UK which crashed and killed him. After Banting's death, Best "claimed that the crucial innovation of using alcohol to remove toxic impurities had largely been his own", even though this had actually been Collip's key contribution. In 1972, an official history of the Nobel Committee declared that omitting Best might have been a mistake. In fact, Best was not considered because he was never nominated. Nomination for a Nobel Prize can only be made by certain individuals, including former recipients of the Prize, and his central role along with Banting was not known to those who had the ability to make nominations. Best was subsequently nominated for the 1950 Nobel Prize in physiology based on his work on choline and heparin. At the Centenary Celebration of the Nobel Prize for the Discovery of Insulin held by the Toronto Medical Society on November 27, 2023, Professor Erling Norrby, former chair of the Nobel Assembly at the Karolinska Institute, made a presentation - The Optimal Nobel Prize for Physiology or Medicine and presented the following information from the Nobel archives:

“Best was nominated 14 times 1950-1954. The main nominator was Henry Dale who had been supervisor for Best’s Ph.D. work. The discovery proposed to be awarded was Best’s work on the lipotropic effect of choline, but Dale argued that separately that Best should have shared the 1923 prize to Banting. Best was subject to four evaluations by Ulf von Euler who gave support to Dale’s nomination. Although Best was declared worthy of a prize (1951, 1952, 1954) he never received it.”

== Professor of physiology ==
Best succeeded Macleod as professor of physiology at University of Toronto in 1929. While at the university, he mentored Aron Rappaport. During World War II he was influential in establishing a Canadian program for securing and using dried human blood serum. In his later years, he was an adviser to the Medical Research Committee of the United Nations World Health Organization.

== Personal life ==
Best later claimed that the greatest moment of his life occurred when he met his future wife, Margaret Mahon (1900–1988) following his return. Best married Margaret Hooper Mahon in Toronto in 1924 and they had two sons. Best's eldest son was Charles Alexander Best, a Canadian politician and geneticist. Best is the grandfather of Susan MacTavish Best. His other son, Henry Best was a well-regarded historian who later became president of Laurentian University in Sudbury, Ontario.

Best died on March 31, 1978, in Toronto. He is interred in Mount Pleasant Cemetery, Toronto, not far from Sir Frederick Banting.

== Awards and honours ==
Best was elected a foreign member of the Royal Netherlands Academy of Arts and Sciences in 1946. He was elected a foreign honorary member of the American Academy of Arts and Sciences in 1948. He was elected to both the American Philosophical Society and the United States National Academy of Sciences in 1950. In 1967 he was made a Companion of the Order of Canada in recognition for "his contribution to medicine, particularly as co-discoverer of insulin." He was a commander of the Civil Division of the Order of the British Empire and was made a member of Order of the Companions of Honour in 1971 "for services to Medical Research". He was a fellow of the Royal Society of London, the Royal Society of Canada, and was the first Canadian to be elected into the Pontifical Academy of Sciences.

As a recipient of the Order of Canada, he was awarded the Canadian version of the Queen Elizabeth II Silver Jubilee Medal in 1977.

In 1994 he was inducted into the Canadian Medical Hall of Fame. In 2004, he was inducted into the National Inventors Hall of Fame.

Dr. Charles Best Secondary School in Coquitlam, British Columbia, Dr. Charles Best Public School in Burlington, Ontario, and Charles H. Best Middle School in Toronto, Ontario, are named in his honour. His birthplace in Maine is listed on the United States National Register of Historic Places.

== Honorary degrees ==
Dr. Charles Best received 18 honorary degrees from universities around the world including

- University of Chicago (D.Sc) in 1941
- Université Sorbonne de Paris
- University of Cambridge
- University of Oxford
- University of Amsterdam 8 January 1947
- University of Louvain
- University of Liège
- University of Chile
- University of Uruguay
- University of San Marcos
- University of Melbourne (LL.D) in 1952
- University of Edinburgh (LL.D) in 1959
- Northwestern University (D.Sc) in 1959
- Aristotelian University of Thessaloniki
- Free University of Berlin
- Hebrew University of Jerusalem in 1972
- University of Zagreb
- University of Toronto (LL.D) in 1970.

== See also ==
- Nicolae Paulescu
