= History of diabetes =

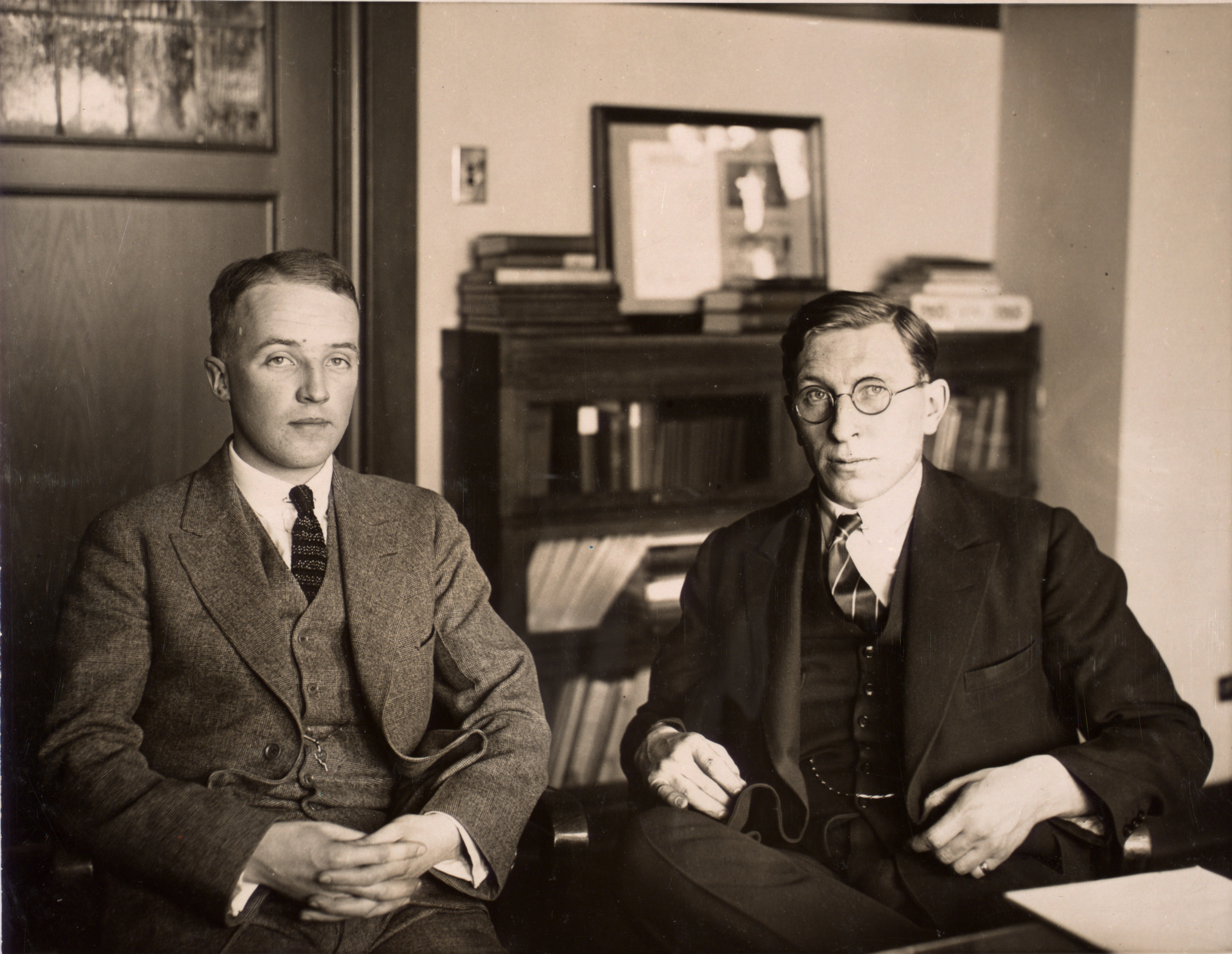
Frederick Banting (right) joined by Charles Best in office, 1924

The condition known today as diabetes (usually referring to diabetes mellitus) is thought to have been described in the Ebers Papyrus (c. 1550 BC). Ayurvedic physicians (5th/6th century BC) first noted the sweet taste of diabetic urine, and called the condition madhumeha ("honey urine"). The term diabetes traces back to Demetrius of Apamea (1st century BC). For a long time, the condition was described and treated in traditional Chinese medicine as xiāo kě (消渴; "wasting-thirst"). Physicians of the medieval Islamic world, including Avicenna, have also written on diabetes. Early accounts often referred to diabetes as a disease of the kidneys. In 1674, Thomas Willis suggested that diabetes may be a disease of the blood. Johann Peter Frank is credited with distinguishing diabetes mellitus and diabetes insipidus in 1794.

In regard to diabetes mellitus, Joseph von Mering and Oskar Minkowski are commonly credited with the formal discovery (1889) of a role for the pancreas in causing the condition. In 1893, Édouard Laguesse suggested that the islet cells of the pancreas, described as "little heaps of cells" by Paul Langerhans in 1869, might play a regulatory role in digestion. These cells were named islets of Langerhans after the original discoverer. In the beginning of the 20th century, physicians hypothesized that the islets secrete a substance (named "insulin") that metabolises carbohydrates. The first to isolate the extract used, called insulin, was Nicolae Paulescu. In 1916, he succeeded in developing an aqueous pancreatic extract which, when injected into a diabetic dog, proved to have a normalizing effect on blood sugar levels. Then, while Paulescu served in army, during World War I, the discovery and purification of insulin for clinical use in 1921–1922 was achieved by a group of researchers in Toronto—Frederick Banting, John Macleod, Charles Best, and James Collip—paved the way for treatment. The patent for insulin was assigned to the University of Toronto in 1923 for a symbolic dollar to keep treatment accessible.

In regard to diabetes insipidus, treatment became available before the causes of the disease were clarified. The discovery of an antidiuretic substance extracted from the pituitary gland by researchers in Italy (A. Farini and B. Ceccaroni) and Germany (R. Von den Velden) in 1913 paved the way for treatment. By the 1920s, accumulated findings defined diabetes insipidus as a disorder of the pituitary. The main question now became whether the cause of diabetes insipidus lay in the pituitary gland or the hypothalamus, given their intimate connection. In 1954, Berta and Ernst Scharrer concluded that the hormones were produced by the nuclei of cells in the hypothalamus.

== Early accounts ==
=== Ancient Egypt (c. 1550 BC) ===
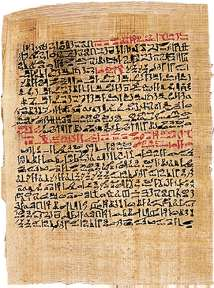
Ebers Papyrus

The Ebers Papyrus is among the oldest and most important medical papyri of Ancient Egypt. Written c. 1550 BC, it was likely copied from a series of much earlier texts, and contains a passage from the First Dynasty (c. 3400 BC). The document is named after Georg Ebers, who purchased the document in 1872 in the city of Luxor, the site of Thebes (known to Ancient Egyptians as Waset). Thebes was the most venerated city of Ancient Egypt in its heyday during the Middle Kingdom and New Kingdom.

The Ebers Papyrus is thought to contain the first known medical reference to diabetes, by the phrase: "...to eliminate urine which is too asha". The crucial word asha can mean both "plentiful" and "often". It is unclear whether the condition described was excessive urine (polyuria), which may have been symptomatic of diabetes, or increased frequency of urine, very often due to urinary tract infection.

The following mixture was prescribed for treatment: "A measuring glass filled with Water from the Bird pond, Elderberry, Fibres of the asit plant, Fresh Milk, Beer-Swill, Flower of the Cucumber, and Green Dates". Urinary troubles in the adult were also corrected with "rectal injections of olive oil, honey, sweet beer, sea salt, and seeds of the wonderfruit".

=== Ayurveda (5th/6th century BC) ===
Ayurveda is a Hindu system of medicine with historic roots in the Indian subcontinent. Some of its conceptual origins trace back to the Indus Valley civilisation. It developed significantly through the Vedic period.

Polyuria in diabetes was associated with a sweet taste of urine in Sanskrit texts of the 5th/6th century BC, at the time of two notable physicians Sushruta and Charaka. They described several diseases of polyuric nature collectively called Prameha ("to flow"). Included in this group of ailments was the equivalent of diabetes mellitus, madhumeha ("honey urine"), named as such because the sweet urine of patients would attract ants and flies. These patients are said to have suffered from extreme thirst and foul breath.

Ayurvedic texts provided dietary prescriptions for the condition. They constitute the earliest known references to the presence of sugar in the urine (glycosuria) and to dietary remedies, at least a thousand years before modern European descriptions began to more comprehensively conceptualize the disease. Sushruta and Charaka also identified the two types of diabetes mellitus, later dubbed Type I and Type II diabetes.

=== Ancient China ===
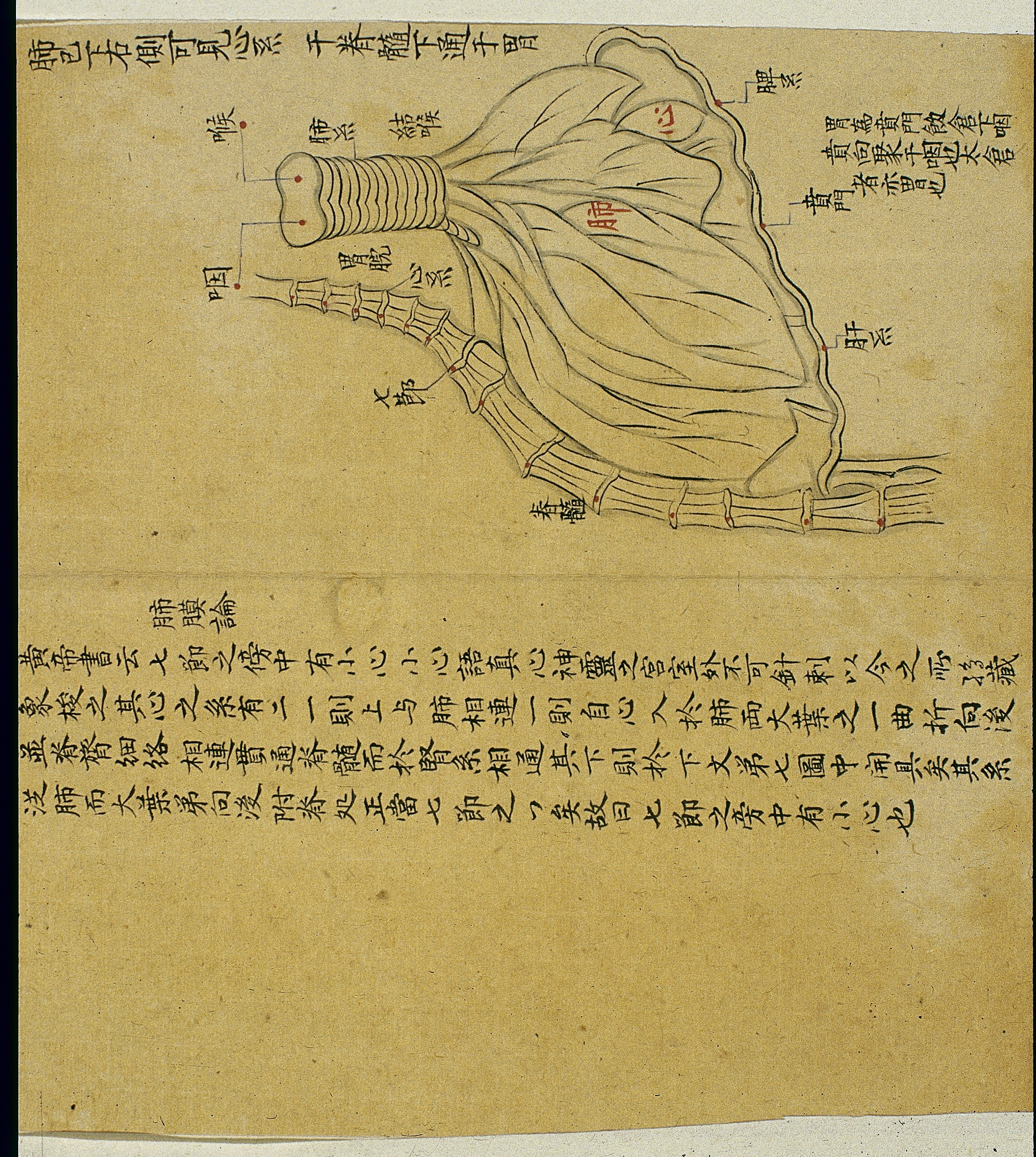
A Qing-era drawing of the lungs and heart nexus. Illustrates the Huangdi Neijing (The Yellow Emperor's Classic of Internal Medicine)

Modern-day diabetes is associated with two terms in the Chinese language. The traditional term, xiāo kě (消渴), means "wasting-thirst" and correlates closely with diabetes in most instances of historical description. The more modern term, táng niǎo bìng (糖尿病), means "sugar urine disease", and is equivalent to diabetes mellitus. It has been suggested that the modern term is derived from exchanges with Ayurvedic practitioners who called the condition madhumeha ("honey urine"). Within the Sinosphere (regions of East and Southeast Asia historically influenced by the linguistic and literary traditions of the Chinese empire), (Note: Most parts of Southeast Asia fall under both the Sinosphere and the Indosphere.) this etymology has also been borrowed into Korean (tang nyo byeong [당뇨병]) and Japanese (tou nyou byou [とうにょうびょう]).

Reviews of diabetology history in Traditional Chinese medicine have classified the diagnosis and treatment of xiāo kě (消渴) into four periods, summarized below. Classic texts provided a typology of the condition and outlined various recommendations on diagnosis, development, treatment, and prevention. (Note: Preferred English titles/annotations can be found on pages 271–282 of the World Health Organization's international standard terminologies manual on traditional medicine for the Western Pacific region.) (Note: Names of authors and physicians are written so that their last name appears first.) Knowledge of wasting-thirst was integrated with knowledge of diabetes during the Qing dynasty.

==== The Yellow Emperor's Classic of Internal Medicine (475 BC – 8 AD) ====
Huángdì Nèijīng (黃帝內經), or The Yellow Emperor's Classic of Internal Medicine, is a fundamental ancient text in Chinese medicine and a major book of Daoist philosophy and lifestyle. It is generally dated to the late Warring States period (475–221 BC) and the Western Han dynasty (206 BC – 8 AD).

The text named the condition xiāo kě (消渴; "wasting-thirst") and elaborated on it through 25 clauses. It recorded such symptoms as "three increases [excess] and one decrease [loss]": excessive thirst (polydypsia), excessive hunger (polyphagia), excessive urine (polyuria), and weight loss. Three sub-phases of xiāo kě were given, characterized by their dominant symptoms. These roughly correspond to the progressive stages of diabetes in modern-day Western medicine.

==== The Treatise on Cold Damage and Miscellaneous Diseases (9–280 AD) ====
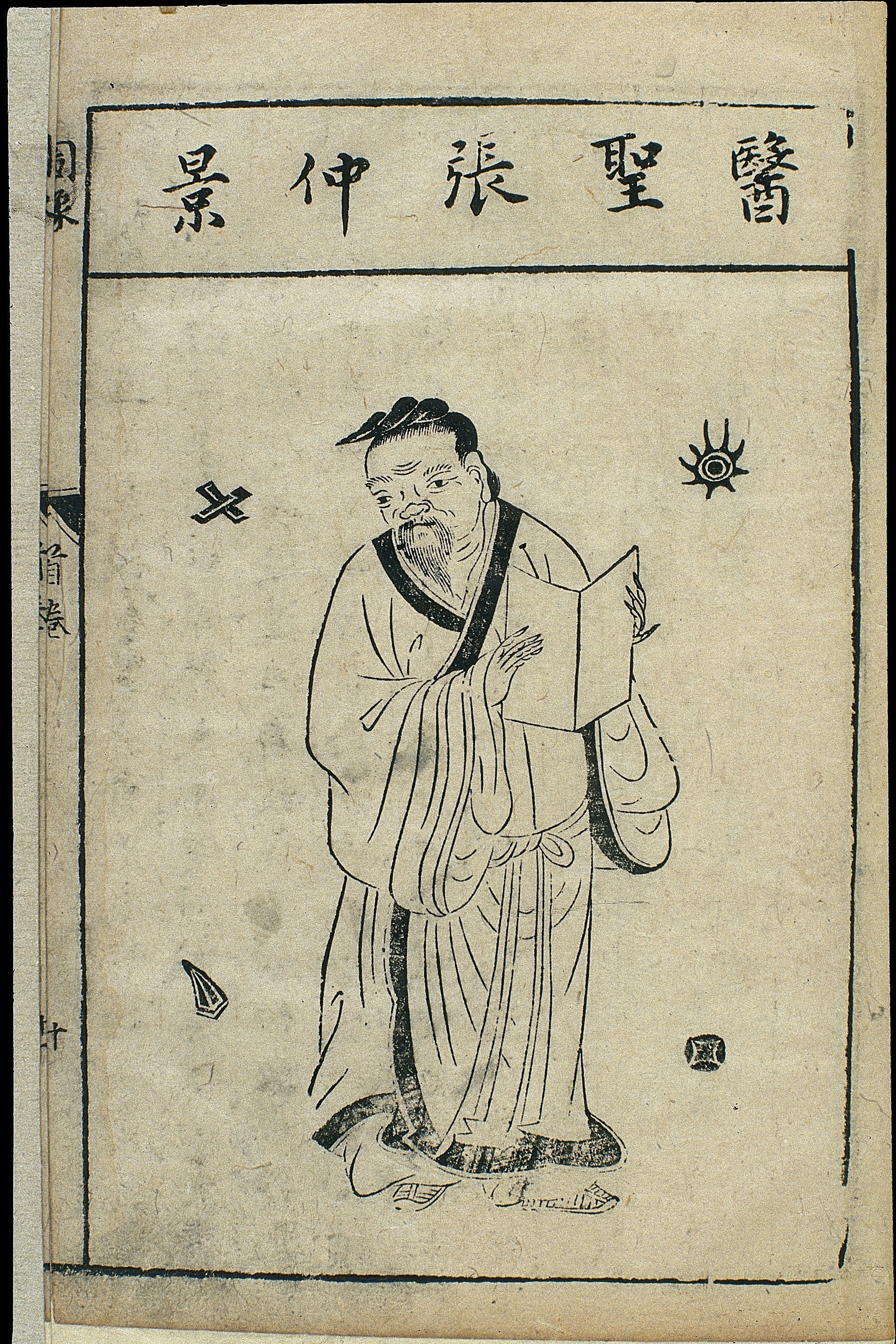
Woodcut of Zhang Zhongjing. Engraved during the reign of Wanli of the Ming dynasty.

Shānghán Zábìng Lùn (傷寒雜病論), or The Treatise on Cold Damage and Miscellaneous Diseases, is the first Chinese monograph on diseases by Zhang Zhongjing. The original work is lost, but most of its contents are preserved in two extant works called Shānghán Lùn (傷寒論; "The Treatise on Cold Damage") and Jīnguì Yàolüè (金匱要略; "Essential Prescriptions from the Golden Chamber"). The first work primarily addresses externally triggered conditions while the latter work describes internally generated conditions.

Zhang's specialized chapter on xiāo kě is found in Shānghán Lùn and Jīnguì Yàolüè. Nine subsections and nine formulae (herbal remedies) on wasting-thirst were recorded. The text proposed a theory of "three wasting-thirsts": upper- (associated with the lungs), middle- (associated with the stomach), and lower- (associated with the kidneys), all three of which shared excessive urine and thirst as symptoms. This theory was later expanded through the works of Liu Wansu (1120–1200 AD) and Wang Kentang (1549–1613 AD). According to Liu, "lower wasting-thirst" attributed to "kidney-yin deficiency" was associated with sweet urine (glycosuria). This may indicate differentiation akin to modern-day differentiation of diabetes mellitus and diabetes insipidus.

==== Extensive development of "wasting-thirst" (265–1368) ====
The diagnosis and treatment of xiāo kě was expanded significantly through the Sui (581–618) and Tang (618–907) dynasties. Zeng Liyan (545–649) expounded on the diagnosis of modern-day diabetes mellitus through the presence of sugar in the urine (glycosuria). This characterization was echoed by other physicians in the centuries that followed. Notably, in Wàitái Mìyào (外臺秘要; "Medical Secrets of an Official") written in 752, Wang Tao (fl. 8th century AD) included a detailed case report of sweet urine and a summary of diabetology history before the Tang dynasty.

Sun Simiao (581–682 AD) further developed approaches to treatment, prevention, regulation, nursing, and convalescence. The formulae for wasting-thirst grew from one in The Yellow Emperor's Classic of Internal Medicine, to nine in Zhang Zhongjing's works, to 73 in Sun Simiao's. The selection of herbs grew from one (Eupatorium fortunei), to dozens used by Zhang, to over one hundred used by Sun.

==== Integration of Chinese and Western medicine (1368–1949) ====
During the Ming (1368–1644) and Qing (1644–1912) dynasties, medical discoveries slowed but practitioners achieved significant knowledge integration across cultures. Over one hundred comprehensive medical monographs were cultivated, many synthesizing developments in the study of wasting-thirst and of diabetes.

Zhang Xichun (1860–1933), a renowned integrator of medical knowledge, produced (among other works) Yīxué zhōng zhōng cānxī lù (医学衷中参西录; "The Integration of Traditional Chinese and Western Medicine"). In a dedicated chapter named "Xiāo-kě therapies", he discussed the following aspects synthesizing wasting-thirst and diabetes: nomenclature, theories (pathologies), primary formulae, medications (herbology and pharmacology), nursing (diet and maintenance), medical cases, and integrated analysis (protein and essence; qi and fluids).

Yu Yunxiu (1879–1954), a Japanese-educated practitioner of Western medicine aligned with the modernizer camp of the Chinese Ministry of Health, attempted to forbid the practice of Chinese medicine in 1929. In 1939, he wrote on the rough equivalence of wasting-thirst and diabetes.

=== Classical antiquity ===
Greco-Roman accounts of what we now know as diabetes primarily describe excessive urination (polyuria). There is no known account of sweetness in early Greco-Roman concepts of the disease. Given the lasting legacy of classical medicine, these descriptions remained highly influential into the Middle Ages in Europe.

==== Greek writers ====
It is assumed that the Hippocratic Corpus bears no direct mention of what we now know as diabetes. However, a number of indirect statements referring to excessive and "watery urine" suggest that Hippocratic writers may have been familiar with the condition. According to On Ancient Medicine, Hippocrates was under the impression that the slumbering and thirst which resulted from high blood sugar was due to the bowels struggling to digest too much food and the weaknesses resulting from low blood sugar were because the body lacked nourishment due to missing a meal.

The term diabetes is derived from the Ionic for 'siphon', meaning "to pass or run through". It reflects the dominant notion at the time that fluids consumed by the diabetic patient passed through the body unchanged, as if flowing through a tube or siphon. A number of conflicting accounts exist as to the first use of this term, placing the originator as either Apollonius of Memphis (fl. 3rd century BC), Demetrius of Apamea (fl. 100 BC), or Aretaeus of Cappadocia (fl. early 2nd century AD). In-depth probes of Greek etymology agree that the term came from Demetrius of Apamea, C. L. Gemmill (1972) states:

Caelius Aurelianus prepared a Latin version of the works of Soranus. In the index of the Drabkin edition there is a subject heading "Diabetes," but on examination of the text this section could not be found (footnote 3, p. 776) except for a short paragraph. In this paragraph Caelius quotes Apollonius of Memphis as separating two forms of dropsy, one marked by retention of fluid and the other by the inability to retain fluid; the patient discharges whatever he drinks as if it were passed through a pipe. Apollonius lived in the second half of the third century B.C. Caelius Aurelianus continues by stating that Demetrius of Apamea distinguishes this disease from dropsy in which any fluid that is drunk is discharged as urine. Demetrius calls this condition diabetes. The time of Demetrius of Apamea is given as the first century B.C. None of his works have come down to us; we have only quotations in later authors. Caelius Aurelianus apparently assigned a special chapter for the discussion of diabetes but this chapter seems to have been lost. I have looked for it in the 1529 edition edited by Johnnes Sichart without success. I have attempted to reconstruct this passage on diabetes from later authors noted for their ability to copy, but have not been able to find it. The early printers discarded the manuscripts after their publications were printed; therefore it is unlikely that this missing section will be found. The chief fact is that the concept of diabetes goes back to Demetrius, who lived in the first century B.C.

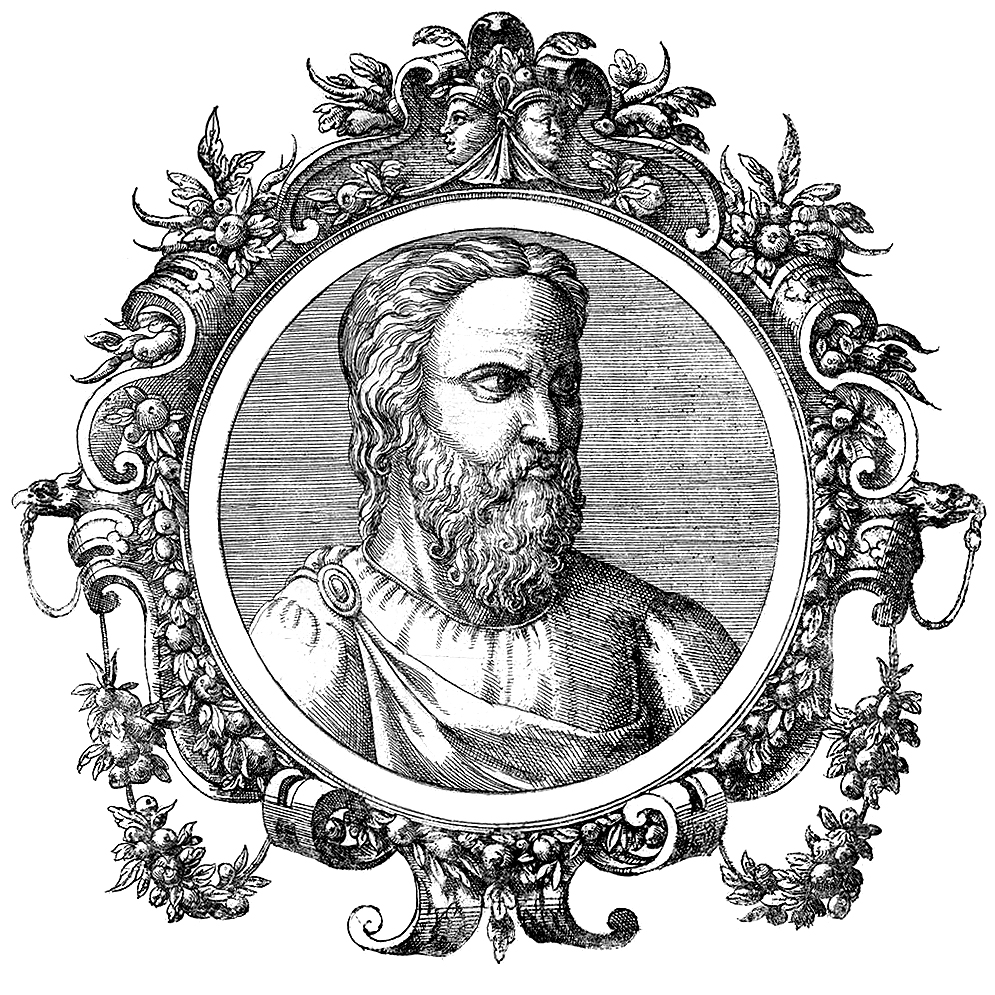
Engraved portrait of Aretaeus by Ioannes Sambucus (1574)

In his classic description of diabetes, Aretaeus of Cappadocia (fl. early 2nd century AD) noted the excessive amount of urine that passed through the kidney. He also noted its rarity ("Diabetes is a wonderful affection, not very frequent among men..."). He described the disease as "a melting down of the flesh and limbs into urine" and attributed it to the bladder and kidneys, commenting that "life (with diabetes) is short, disgusting and painful."

Aretaeus's contemporary Galen (129–200 AD) stressed that diabetes was a disease of the kidneys and affirmed its rarity, having observed it "only twice" at the time he wrote On the affected parts.

Aretaeus and the others authors under discussion did not differentiate between diabetes mellitus and diabetes insipidus. It is assumed that they were referring to diabetes mellitus, although Swedish physician F. Henschen has suggested that Aretaeus and Galen may have instead been referring to diabetes insipidus. For all practical purposes, however, diabetes insipidus remained unrecognized well into the 17th century.

==== Roman writers ====
Aulus Cornelius Celsus (fl. 30 BC – 50 AD), who interpreted Greek works in Latin, provided an early clinical description of diabetes in his eight-volume work titled De Medicina. He wrote that "urine exceeds in quantity the fluid taken even if it is passed painlessly." This concept of an imbalance between the ingested and excreted amounts of fluid was repeated by many authors into the Middle Ages.

Rufus of Ephesus (fl. 98–117 AD), a physician famous for his work on the variations of the pulse, described the symptoms of diabetes as "incessant thirst" and immediate urination after drinking, which he called "urinary diarrhea".

==== Byzantine writers ====
Physician Oribasius (c. 320–403), personal physician of the emperor and philosopher Julian, compiled all known ancient medical texts of his time by theme into medical encyclopedia. He quotes Galen and Rufus on diabetes, considering it to be a polyuric disease of the kidneys. Various descriptive names are given for the condition, including: chamber-pot dropsy, diarrhea of the urine (diarrhea urinosa), and the thirsty disease.

These descriptions, along with a number of other names for the condition ("liuria", "extreme thirst or dipsacus"), were echoed by later Byzantine writers in key encyclopedic texts.

=== Medieval Islamic world ===
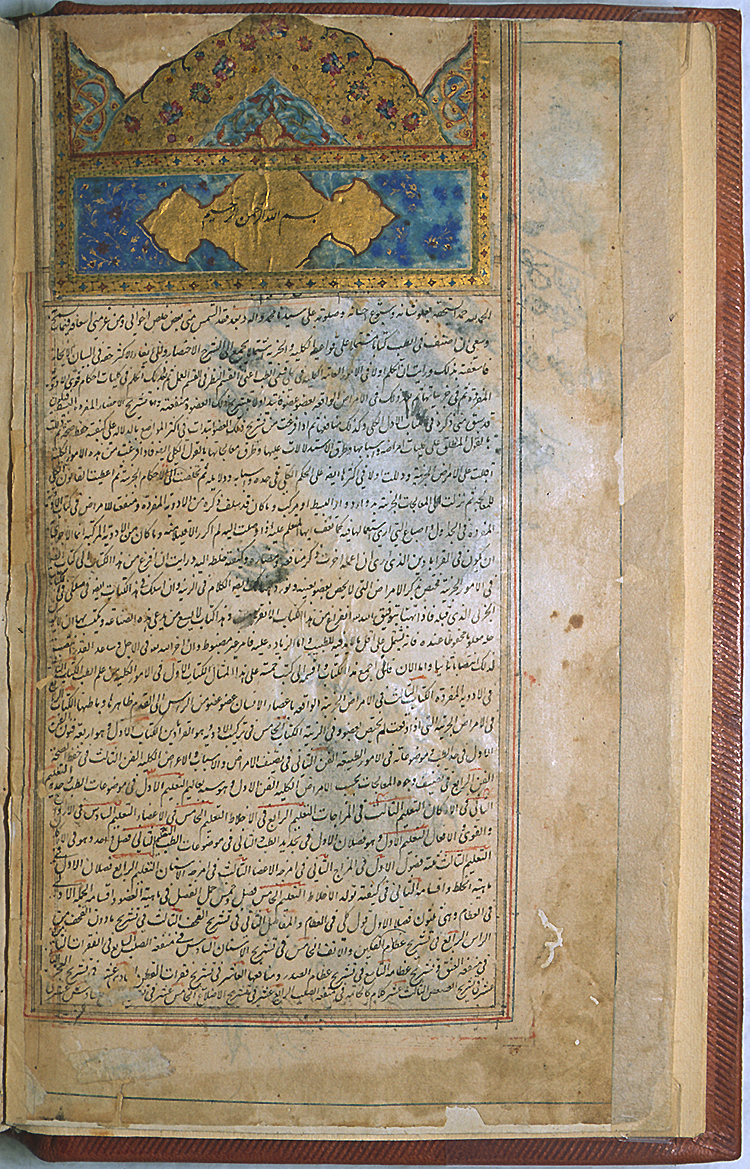
The Canon of Medicine by Avicenna

During the Islamic Golden Age under the Abbasid Caliphate, (Note: The Abbasid Caliphate was the third of the caliphates. A caliphate is a multi-ethnic empire ruled by leaders (caliphs) who were considered the political-religious successors to the Islamic prophet Muhammad. It had two major periods. During the first (750–1258), it ruled from Baghdad as a strong empire in which culture, science, and trade flourished (often referred to as the Islamic Golden Age). In 1258, the Mongol Empire sacked Baghdad. This gave rise to the second period (1261–1517), in which the Abbasid Caliphate was re-established under the Mamluk Sultanate as a religious dynasty with diminished political and military power.) prominent Muslim physicians preserved, systematized and developed ancient medical knowledge from across the Eurasian continent. They synthesized concepts from classical antiquity (see: Ancient Greece, Ancient Rome), Persia, Ayurveda, and China. This work laid the foundations for later advances in medieval European medicine as European physicians came into contact with Islamic authors through the Renaissance of the 12th century.

Rhazes (c. 865–925), or Muhammad ibn Zakariya al-Razi, included writings about diabetes in the more than 230 books he produced in his lifetime.

Avicenna (980–1037), or Ibn Sina, was a court physician to the caliphs of Baghdad and a key figure in medicine who compiled an exhaustive medical encyclopedia titled The Canon of Medicine. His account detailed the clinical features of diabetes, and termed the disease albulab ("water wheel") and zalkh el kuliah ("diarrhea of the kidneys"). He documented "the abnormal appetite and the collapse of sexual functions" and the sweet taste of diabetic urine, and further differentiated diabetes associated with emaciation from other causes of polyuria. He also elaborated on diabetic gangrene and treated diabetes using a mixture of lupine, trigonella (fenugreek), and zedoary seed.

It has been noted that references to diabetes expanded in the medical texts of this period. Eknoyan and Nagy (2005) speculate that this indicates the increasing prevalence of the disease. Other interpretations are also possible, including that the increasing references are the result of more systematic knowledge sharing practices.

Maimonides (c. 1135–1204), a renowned philosopher and polymath of the era in both the Jewish and Islamic worlds, claimed to have seen more than 20 cases (in contrast to Galen's two cases).

Abd al-Latif al-Baghdadi (1162–1231), also a philosopher and polymath, produced a treatise dedicated to diabetes (On Diabetes, Fols. 140v-149r).

=== Modern Europe ===
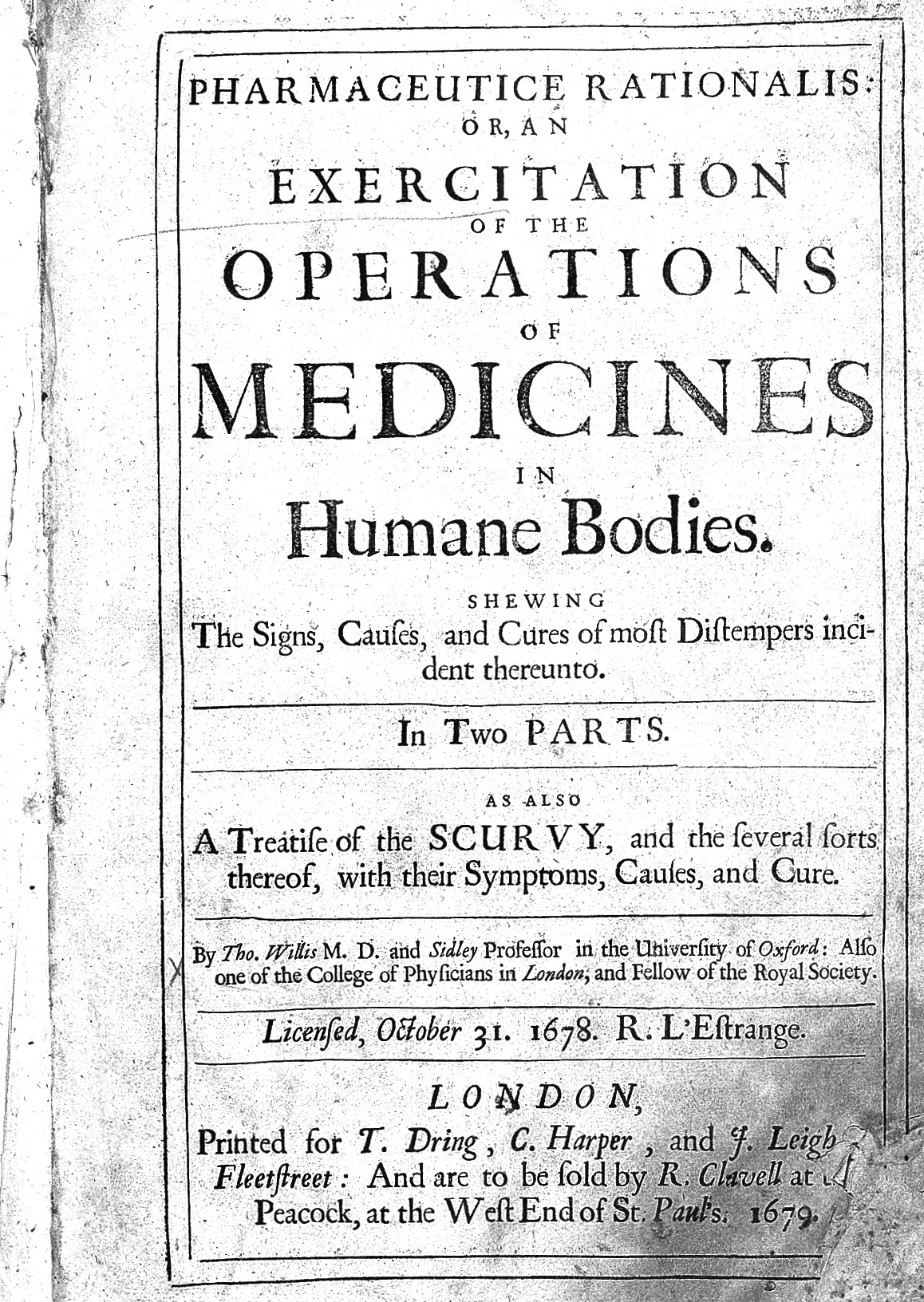
Thomas Willis's Pharmaceutice rationalis (from 1679)

In the 16th century, Paracelsus (1493–1541) described diabetes as a constitutional disease that "irritates the kidneys" and provokes excessive urination. He reported that evaporating urine from a diabetic patient left an excessive residue, which he called "salts". It has, however, been noted that he advised tasting the urine for sweetness in other contexts.

In 1674, Thomas Willis made reference to the sweet taste of diabetic urine in Pharmaceutice rationalis. While this reiterated ancient observations from across the Eurasian continent, it is generally understood to be the first explicit reference to sugary diabetic fluids in the modern European context. However, contrary to some claims that the term mellitus was added by Thomas Willis to specify the condition by its glycosuria, the word appears nowhere in his chapter on diabetes. The verifiable statement that may be derived from relevant sources is that Willis elaborated on glycosuria but did not distinguish between different types of diabetes. Notably, Willis disagreed with the common idea that the disorder originated in the kidneys ("Reins"), suggesting instead that it was a "Distemper of the Blood than of the Reins [Kidneys]". He also noted the connection between the condition and certain dietary habits, "chiefly an assiduous and immoderate drinking of Cider, Beer, or sharp Wines".

The presence of sugar in the urine (glycosuria) and in the blood (hyperglycemia) was demonstrated through the work of a number of physicians in the late 18th century, including Robert Wyatt (1774) and Matthew Dobson (1776).

In 1769, William Cullen called attention to diabetic urine that was "insipid" in taste:

I myself, indeed, think I have met with one instance of diabetes in which the urine was perfectly insipid; and it would seem that a like observation had occurred to Dr. Martin Lister. I am persuaded, however, that such instances are very rare; and that the other is much more common and perhaps the almost universal occurrence. I judge therefore, that the presence of such a saccharine matter may be considered as the principal circumstance in idiopathic diabetes.

In 1788, Thomas Cawley published a case study in the London Medical Journal based on an autopsy of a diabetic patient. He suggested a link between the pancreas and diabetes after observing stones and signs of tissue damage in the patient's pancreas. The significance of this discovery went unappreciated for another hundred years.

In 1794, Johann Peter Frank of the University of Pavia found that his patients were characterized by "long continued abnormally increased secretion of non-saccharine urine which is not caused by a diseased condition of the kidneys". He introduced the term insipidus, derived from the Latin ('tasteless'). Frank is often credited as the first physician to describe clinical differences between diabetes mellitus and diabetes insipidus. This claim, however, warrants further examination given prior instances of comparable description (e.g. those by William Cullen). It has been noted that 1792 seems to be the year when "unequivocal" diabetes insipidus was first described in the medical literature.

There was a lingering ambiguity in the general notion of "diabetes", especially as it manifests very differently in diabetes mellitus and in diabetes insipidus. In 1843, William Prout aptly summarized the general notion of diabetes of the time as follows:

The term diabetes, implying simply an increased flow of urine, is applicable to any disease in which that symptom is present in a remarkable degree. This general use of the term, however, has caused a great deal of confusion; as a variety of diseases differing altogether in their nature, except in the accidental circumstances of being accompanied by diuresis, or a large flow of urine, have in consequence been confounded with one another. To prevent this confusion in future, I would recommend that the term be restricted to those affections in which the urine is saccharine. Hence I define Diabetes to be a disease in which a saccharine state of the urine is the characteristic symptom.

== Pathophysiology ==
Pathophysiology refers to the physiological processes associated with a disease or injury. In the history of medicine, diseases became better understood as human anatomy became better understood. The development of autopsy in the 15th and 16th centuries was key to this learning. As anatomists detailed the complex structures of the human body, they began to pay more attention to the pathological structures associated with diseases, their causes and effects, and mechanisms of progress. By the 18th century, many such pathologic observations were being published in textbooks and journals. This work lay important foundations for advances in medical treatment and intervention.

Historically, various notions of present-day "diabetes" have described some general mix of excessive urine (polyuria), excessive thirst (polydipsia), and weight loss (see: History of diabetes#Early accounts). Over the past few centuries, these symptoms have been linked to updated understandings of how the disease works, and how it manifests differently across cases. This section outlines these developments as various diabetic conditions have become better understood.

=== Diabetes mellitus ===
Today, the term "diabetes" most commonly refers to diabetes mellitus. Diabetes mellitus is itself an umbrella term for a number of different diseases involving problems processing sugars that have been consumed (glucose metabolism). Historically, this is the "diabetes" which has been associated with sugary urine (glycosuria).

==== Role of the pancreas ====
In 1683, a surgical experiment by Johann Conrad Brunner almost led to a medical breakthrough. He excised the pancreas of a neighbour's hunting dog, causing polyuria and polydipsia. Brunner very clearly described these classic symptoms in pancreatectomized dogs, but made no association with diabetes.

In 1788, Thomas Cawley published a case study in the London Medical Journal based on an autopsy of a diabetic patient. He observed stones and signs of tissue damage in the patient's pancreas, noting that the "right extremity of the pancreas was very hard, and appeared to be scirrhous." Considering the idea that diabetes "be not a disease of the kidneys", he suggested that "a cure may have been effected... provided the stomach and organs subservient to digestion had retained their digestive power". In the decades that followed, Richard Bright (1831) and Von Recklinhausen (1864) also reported gross changes in the pancreas of diabetic patients. Claude Bernard demonstrated the function of pancreatic juice in digestion between 1849 and 1856, clarifying an important link in the pathophysiology of diabetes.

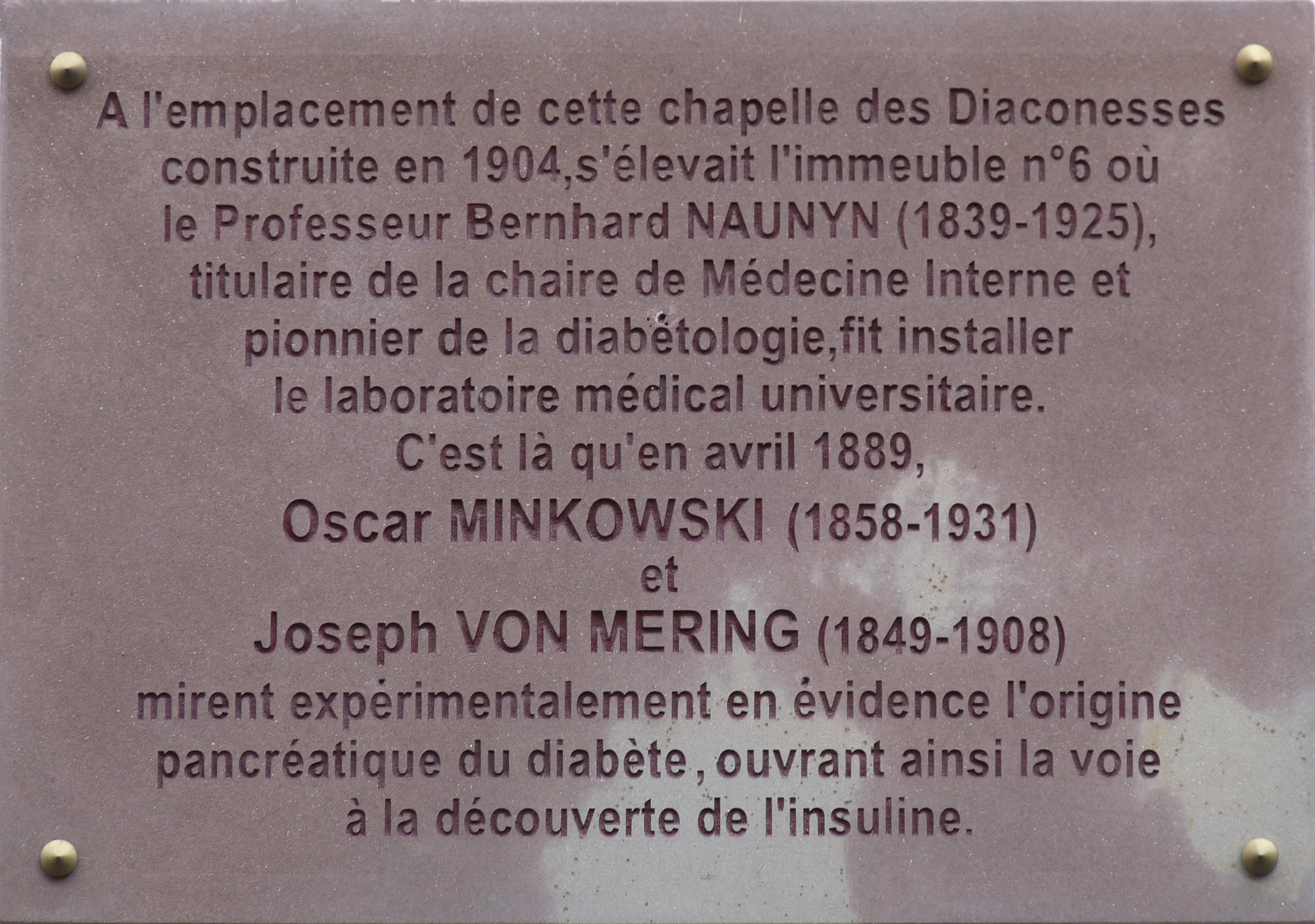
Plaque in Strasbourg commemorating the 1889 discovery by Minkowski and Von Mering

In 1889, Joseph von Mering and Oskar Minkowski excised the pancreas of a dog, which soon developed the symptoms of diabetes. According to some accounts, Minkowski was taught by his supervisor, Bernhard Naunyn, to test for sugar in urine whenever he noticed polyuria. According to some other accounts, a laboratory attendant pointed out that only the urine of the pancreatectomized dogs attracted flies, prompting the researchers to test for sugar. Ultimately, the pair tested for sugar in the urine and confirmed the connection with diabetes mellitus. This event is commonly credited as the formal discovery of a role for the pancreas in diabetes. While the researchers continued to work on obtaining a pancreatic extract, they were unable to obtain the presumed anti-diabetic substance.

In 1893, Charles Édouard Eutrope "Emmanuel" Hédon (1863–1933) in Montpellier conducted a pancreatectomy in two stages. In the first, he took out almost all of the pancreas, cutting off the supply of pancreatic juice entirely. He then left a small remnant of pancreas grafted under the dog's skin. The dog did not become diabetic until the remaining graft was also excised, leading Hédon to the conclusion that the pancreas must have two functions: digestion via an external secretion, and carbohydrate metabolism via some internal secretion that was released directly into the bloodstream. John MacLeod, among the Toronto group that later isolated and purified insulin for clinical use, cited this finding as the most convincing proof of an internal secretion in his 1913 book, Diabetes: Its Pathological Physiology.

Also in 1893, Édouard Laguesse suggested that the islet cells of the pancreas, described as "little heaps of cells" by Paul Langerhans in 1869, might play a regulatory role in digestion. These cells were named Islets of Langerhans after the original discoverer. Soon after, it was established that the role of the pancreas in carbohydrate metabolism could be localized to the islets; Eugene Lindsay Opie (1901) confirmed this connection in relation to diabetes mellitus. In 1909, Belgian physician Jean de Mayer hypothesized that the islets secrete a substance that plays this metabolic role, and termed it insulin, from the Latin insula ('island'). Sir Edward Albert Sharpey-Schafer independently proposed the same in 1916, not knowing at the time that de Meyer had made the same suggestion a few years prior.

The endocrine role of the pancreas in metabolism, and indeed the existence of insulin, was further clarified between 1921 and 1922 when a group of researchers in Toronto, including Frederick Banting, Charles Best, John MacLeod, and James Collip, were able to isolate and purify the extract.

==== Types of diabetes mellitus ====
Between 1850 and 1875, French researchers Apollinaire Bouchardat and Étienne Lancereaux (1829–1910) acknowledged a need for classification. They distinguished between those diabetics that were lean, had severe symptoms, poor outcomes, and pancreatic lesions at autopsy (diabetes maigre), and those that were overweight, presented later in life with a milder form of the disease and had a better prognosis if put on a low-calorie diet (diabetes gras). These descriptions are comparable to the two types identified by Ayurvedic physicians Sushruta and Charaka (400–500 AD), with one type being associated with youth and the other with being overweight.

Harold Percival Himsworth established a clearer distinction in 1936, differentiating two types of diabetes based on sensitivity to insulin (both injected and pancreatic). In 1950, R. D. Lawrence observed that some diabetics were deficient in insulin and that some were not. Philip Hugh-Jones, while working in Jamaica in 1955, clarified Lawrence's classification and coined the terms "type 1" and "type 2" diabetes. He also noted a rarer variety observed in insulin-resistant youth (whose condition could not be placed into the two types). He called this third group "type J", where J stood for Jamaica.

The terms type 1 and 2 were for some time forgotten. In 1976, they were revived and popularized by Andrew Cudworth after he discovered the link between type 1 diabetes and a specific genetic marker.

=== Diabetes insipidus ===
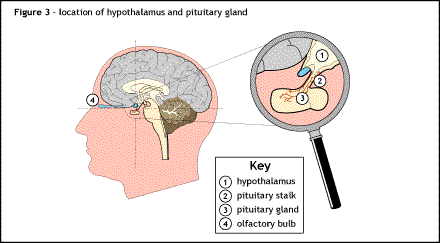

In 1794, Johann Peter Frank gave a relatively clear description of diabetes insipidus, as a "long continued abnormally increased secretion of non-saccharine urine which is not caused by a diseased condition of the kidneys". This remained the general state of knowledge for another century. William Osler, in the first edition of his textbook (1892), summarized the pathophysiology of the condition as follows: "The nature of the disease is unknown. It is doubtless of nervous origin. The most reasonable view is that it results from a vasomotor disturbance of the renal vessels... giving rise to continuous renal congestion."

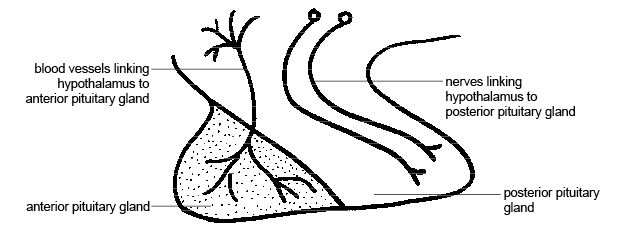

In 1912, Alfred Erich Frank, then working on diabetes mellitus in the department of Oskar Minkowski in Breslau, reported a specific link to the pituitary gland upon observing a case of a man who had survived after shooting himself in the temple. Morris Simmonds drew the same connection in 1913. Thereafter, numerous reports documented cases of diabetes insipidus associated with pituitary lesions, steadily accumulating evidence favouring the hypothesized connection.

George Oliver and Edward Albert Schafer were among the first researchers to document its endocrine functions. In the first two decades of the 20th century, however, a number of conflicting reports on the diuretic versus anti-diuretic properties of the pituitary extract caused confusion in the field. A general agreement was reached that some of the results that reported diuresis was due to increased pressure and blood flow to the kidney, while the posterior pituitary extract had an antidiurectic effect. By the 1920s, accumulated findings defined diabetes insipidus as a disorder of the pituitary.

The main question now became whether the cause of diabetes insipidus lay in the pituitary gland or the hypothalamus, given their intimate connection. In 1920, Jean Camus and Gustave Roussy summarized a number of years of research, reporting that they had produced polyuria in dogs by puncturing the hypothalamus while leaving the pituitary intact. These results were later replicated by many others. Over the next few decades, various competing hypotheses arose as to where and how the "posterior lobe hormones" were produced, transported, and stored. Finally in 1954, Berta and Ernst Scharrer concluded that the hormones were produced by the nuclei of cells in the hypothalamus.

==== Types of diabetes insipidus ====
Since about 1850 it had been known that diabetes insipidus might be a hereditary disorder. In 1945, it was noted that vasopressin had no effect on treating some patients with familial diabetes. Based on this clue, it soon came to light that there exist two types of hereditary diabetes insipidus. In 1947, the anti-diuretic hormone (ADH)-insensitive variety was termed nephrogenic diabetes insipidus (NDI), and attributed to a defect in the loop of Henle and the distal convoluted tubule. Since then, acquired forms of NDI have also been identified and associated with a broad range of causes.

Gestational diabetes insipidus has also been identified as a rare variety of disease that manifests in the third trimester of pregnancy and the early postpartum period.

== Treatment and intervention ==
=== Diabetes mellitus ===
==== Dietary intervention ====
Remedies for diabetes before the mid-1800s often consisted of blends of ingredients, bloodletting, and opium (which was still being mentioned by William Osler in 1915). Another treatment that prevailed into the 20th century was to provide the patient with extra nourishment to compensate for the loss of nutrients to urine. Patients under this regimen were advised to eat as much as possible; sometimes, to eat extra large quantities of sugar. This was misguided advice that resulted in early deaths. Meanwhile, greater success at controlling diabetes was found as physicians began to notice that fasting, not overfeeding, seemed to improve the symptoms of diabetes. Dietary restriction was first reported successful by John Rollo in 1797, and later by Apollinaire Bouchardat, who observed the disappearance of glycosuria in his patients during the rationing while Paris was besieged by the Germans in 1870. A variety of sugar-free, low-carbohydrate diets (occasionally involving physical restraint of patients lacking self-discipline) became increasingly popular.

Among others, Frederick Madison Allen's "starvation diet" was notoriously spartan, but was shown to extend life expectancy. Elizabeth Hughes Gossett, later among the first people to be treated with insulin, was among Allen's patients.

==== Pancreatic extracts before insulin ====
The limit to early diabetes control was partly due to the common-sense assumption that the stomach was wholly responsible for nutrient metabolism. As physiologists came to better understand the metabolic role of other organs, they began to hypothesize alternative causes for the disease. Through accumulating evidence, it was established that the "cause" of diabetes could be localized to the pancreas, then to its internal secretion (see: History of diabetes#Pathophysiology#Role of the pancreas). These findings fueled attempts to treat diabetes in animals and humans with direct extracts from the pancreas, by no less than 400 researchers according to historian Michael Bliss.

In the early 1900s, Georg Ludwig Zuelzer experimented extensively with pancreatic extracts. After initial tests on rabbits, he injected his extracts (which he called acomatol) on humans to clear but inconsistent success and severe side-effects. He nonetheless took out an American patent on his yet-problematic extracts. Unfortunately, Zuelzer was ultimately unable to purify the extract due to difficulty obtaining pancreases, a lack of funding, and interruption by World War I. Ernest Lyman Scott, studying at the University of Chicago between 1911 and 1912, also obtained some promising results but was discouraged from continuing.

In 1913, John MacLeod, at the time several years into research in the area of carbohydrate metabolism and blood sugar behaviour, synthesized the state of research in Diabetes: Its Pathological Physiology. He concluded that there was an internal secretion of the pancreas, but suggested several reasons why it may never be captured in a pancreatic extract. Between 1910 and 1920, techniques for measuring blood sugar (glucose test) were rapidly improved, allowing experiments to be conducted with greater efficiency and precision. These developments also helped establish the notion that high blood sugar levels (hyperglycemia), rather than glycosuria, was the important condition to be relieved.

Working at the Rockefeller Institute for Medical Research between 1915–1919, Israel Kleiner reported convincing results on the effect of ground pancreas solutions on blood sugar levels, using rigorous experimental controls which "theoretically... support[ed] the internal secretion hypothesis of the origin of diabetes" and "practically... suggest[ed] a possible therapeutic application." He discontinued this work upon leaving Rockefeller institute in 1919, for reasons not clearly known. Romanian scientist Nicolae Paulescu, another notable figure in the search for the anti-diabetic factor, began experimenting in 1916 using a slightly saline pancreatic solution like Kleiner's. After being interrupted by the Battle of Bucharest and the postwar turmoil, he published his first results in French in 1920 and 1921. His extracts resulted in clear reduction of blood and urinary sugar in the tested dogs, but had no immediate effect in his human patients (through rectal injection) that could not be duplicated by doses of saline alone. Paulescu took out a Romanian patent on his solution (which he called "pancréine") and method of production, but during the next year, made no further progress with his work due to a lack of funding.

==== Insulin ====
In October 1920, Frederick Banting took interest in carbohydrate metabolism while preparing a talk he was to give his physiology students at Western University in London, Ontario. He encountered an article by Moses Barron which reported an autopsy of a patient whose pancreatic stone had obstructed the main pancreatic duct, but most of the islet cells had survived intact. Banting wrote a note on October 31 of that year describing his thinking: "Ligate pancreatic ducts of dog. Keep dogs alive till acini degenerate leaving Islets. Try to isolate the internal secretion of these to relieve glycosurea [sic]" On November 8, 1920, Banting met with John Macleod, a senior professor of physiology at the University of Toronto, to ask if he might mount a research project on the internal secretion of the pancreas. Banting lacked experience in physiological research and had superficial knowledge of the subject. Nonetheless, Macleod took some interest and accepted Banting's request to work in his lab. On account of what may have interested Macleod, Michael Bliss considers the following:

Speculation is in order here and is permissible because we have some idea of Macleod's knowledge of the literature. Whether he and Banting were discussing grafting or extracting, what must have appealed to Macleod as "never having been tried before" (Note: Quotation marks have been inserted to show that this phrasing refers to Banting's recollections on the exchange between him and Macleod. This account appears on the same page of the cited source.) was the idea of somebody experimenting with degenerated or atrophied pancreas. Now there was nothing new in the idea of producing degeneration or atrophy of the acinar tissues by ligating the pancreatic ducts—all sorts of researchers had done this. Their interest, however, had been almost entirely in measuring the relative amounts of degeneration that took place in the various components of the pancreas, particularly the relative changes in the acinar and islet cells... Nobody had either tried to prepare a graft or administer an extract using a fully degenerated pancreas. And yet, theoretically, if there was an internal secretion, and if it did come from the islets of Langerhans, and if it was the acinar cells but not the islets that degenerated after the ducts were ligated, and if two or three other conditions held good, then perhaps some interesting results would follow. Even if the results were negative, it was the kind of experiment that ought to have been tried long ago, if only for completeness's sake.

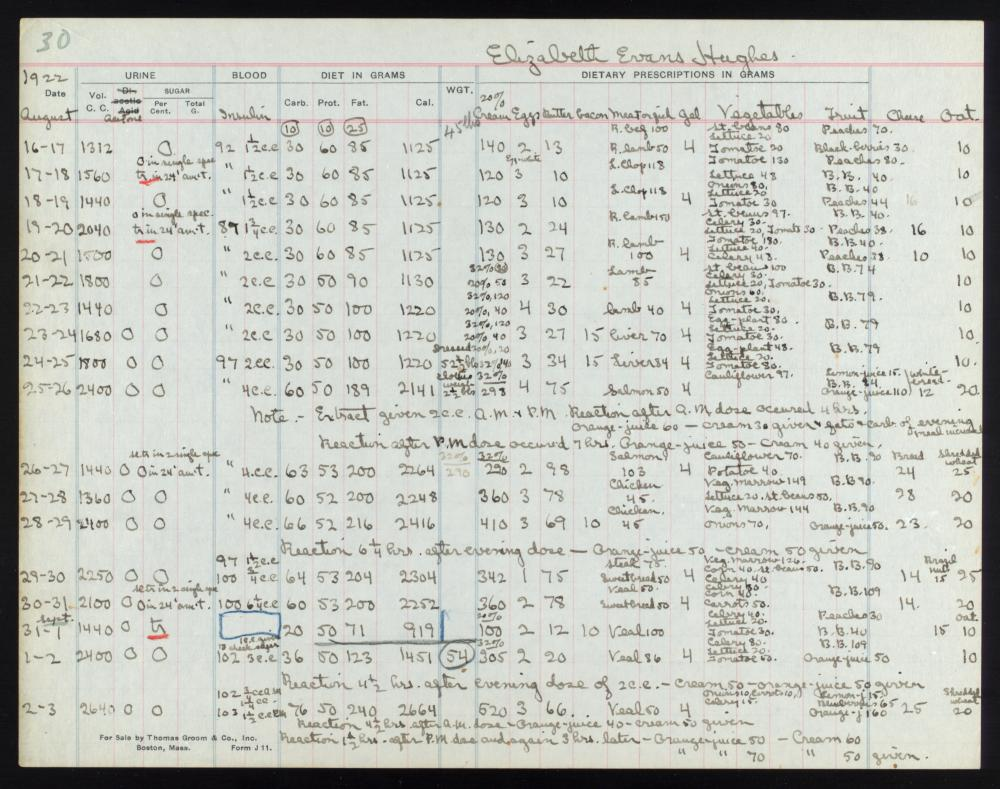
Chart for Elizabeth Hughes (1922)

Banting, Macleod, and student assistant Charles Best began the first experiment on May 17, 1921. (Note: Macleod introduced Banting to Charles Best and Clark Noble, his two student assistants. Best and Noble flipped a coin to decide who would work first so as to take the summer off (the winning option). Best won, and later extended his work into the summer.) On June 14, Macleod left for Scotland and advised remotely through the summer, returning on September 21. (Note: A popular version of the insulin story states that Macleod almost immediately left town for his holidays while Banting and Best made significant discoveries over the summer. Showing transcribed entries from Banting's original notebook, Michael Bliss (1982) notes: "The widely held belief... is not true. The young men had been at the research for almost a month and seemed to have worked through their early technical problems before Macleod left. He talked over the situation with Banting in June and gave fairly explicit "parting instructions" before leaving. Banting wrote down Macleod's summer address in Scotland. He also noted the summer address in Massachusetts of James Collip, the biochemist who had been present at one of the discussions and knew roughly what Banting intended to do.") During this time, Banting and Best obtained mixed but encouraging results. Since they began with the hypothesis (months later falsified through their own work) that it was necessary to avoid the external secretion in order to obtain the internal secretion, they first used degenerated pancreas, then used foetal pancreas obtained from slaughterhouses. (Note: Banting reasoned that because the digestive functions were not yet developed in the foetal pancreas, its use could help bypass the need to degenerate the external secretion-producing tissues of the pancreas. He hit upon this idea from clues in relevant writings (notably by Édouard Laguesse and Anton Julius Carlson). He knew from his childhood experiences on the family farm in Alliston, Ontario, that foetal pancreas would be available from slaughterhouses.) Progress accelerated through December 1921 as it was clarified that pancreatic extracts could be used without removing the external (digestive) secretion.

As the group prepared for clinical trials, biochemist James Collip joined the team at Banting's request to help purify the extract for human injection. On January 23, 1922, Leonard Thompson was successfully treated with Collip's extract at Toronto General Hospital. Six more patients were treated by February 1922 and quickly experienced an improved standard of life. Other notable early recipients of insulin included Elizabeth Hughes, Constance Collier, James D. Havens, and Theodore Ryder. In April 1922, the Toronto group jointly authored a paper summarizing all work thus far, and formally proposed to name the extract "insulin". In October 1923, Banting and Macleod were awarded the Nobel Prize in Physiology based on a nomination by August Krogh for "the discovery of insulin and their exploration of its clinical and physiological characteristics". Banting and Macleod publicly shared the prize with Best and Collip, respectively.

A diabetes clinic was established at Toronto General Hospital that summer to increase capacity for treatment by Banting and collaborating physicians. The non-commercial Connaught Laboratories collaborated with researchers to scale production. Once limits were reached, Toronto contracted with Eli Lilly and Company beginning May 1922 with some caution regarding the commercial nature of the firm (see: Insulin#Patent).

===== Nobel Prize controversy =====
The 1923 Nobel Prize in Physiology awarded to Frederick Banting and John Macleod—publicly shared with Charles Best and James Collip, respectively—sparked controversy as to who was due credit "for the discovery of insulin". Early mass-reproduced accounts of the discovery often emphasized the role of Banting and Best's work, sidelining Macleod and Collip's contributions. This lopsided narrative persisted due to limited availability of documentary evidence and sustained differences in researchers' attitudes toward claiming recognition. During their lifetime, Banting (d. 1941) and Best (d. 1978) were more active—and in some ways, more obviously placed—than Macleod (d. 1935) and Collip (d. 1965) in emphasizing their contributions to the work. However, the criteria advanced to prioritize the pair's early work alone (before the extract was purified) would itself run into challenges in the 1960s and 1970s as attention was drawn to successes in the same year (Nicolae Paulescu) or earlier (George Ludwig Zuelzer, Israel Kleiner).

As tends to be true of any scientific line of inquiry, "the discovery of a preparation of insulin that could be used in treatment" was made possible through the joint effort of team members, and built on the insight of researchers who came before them. In 1954, American doctor Joseph H. Pratt, whose lifelong interest in diabetes and the pancreas went back well before the Toronto discovery, published a "reappraisal" of Macleod and Collip's contributions in refining Banting and Best's flawed experiments and crude extract. After Best died in 1978 and complete documentation (including Banting's papers and Macleod's account of events) became available through the Thomas Fisher Rare Book Library, historian Michael Bliss compiled a comprehensive account of the events surrounding the discovery of insulin. Notably, Bliss's account reviews the nominations and Nobel Prize committee's own investigations that culminated in the 1923 decision.

==== Metformin ====
In 1922, metformin was developed for the treatment of type 2 diabetes mellitus.

==== Further developments ====
Other notable discoveries since the early development of insulin and metformin include:

- Development of the long acting insulin NPH in the 1940s by Novo Nordisk
- Identification of the first of the sulfonylureas in 1942
- Reintroduction of the use of biguanides for type 2 diabetes in the late 1950s. The initial phenformin was withdrawn worldwide (in the U.S. in 1977) due to its potential for sometimes fatal lactic acidosis and metformin was first marketed in France in 1979, but not until 1994 in the US.
- The determination of the amino acid sequence of insulin (by Sir Frederick Sanger, for which he received a Nobel Prize). Insulin was the first protein that the amino acid structure was determined.
- The radioimmunoassay for insulin, as discovered by Rosalyn Yalow and Solomon Berson (gaining Yalow the 1977 Nobel Prize in Physiology or Medicine)
- The three-dimensional structure of insulin (PDB: 2INS)
- Dr Gerald Reaven's identification of the constellation of symptoms now called metabolic syndrome in 1988
- Demonstration that intensive glycemic control in type 1 diabetes reduces chronic side effects more as glucose levels approach 'normal' in a large longitudinal study, and also in type 2 diabetics in other large studies
- Identification of the first thiazolidinedione as an effective insulin sensitizer during the 1990s

In 1980, U.S. biotech company Genentech developed biosynthetic human insulin. The insulin was isolated from genetically altered bacteria (the bacteria contain the human gene for synthesizing synthetic human insulin), which produce large quantities of insulin. The purified insulin is distributed to pharmacies for use by diabetes patients. Initially, this development was not regarded by the medical profession as a clinically meaningful development. However, by 1996, the advent of insulin analogues which had vastly improved absorption, distribution, metabolism, and excretion (ADME) characteristics which were clinically meaningful based on this early biotechnology development.

In 2005, a new drug to treat type 2 diabetes, derived from the Gila monster, was approved by the Food and Drug Administration. The venom of the lizard contains exendin 4, which triggers one of the insulin-releasing pathways.

=== Diabetes insipidus ===
In 1913, researchers in Italy (A. Farini and B. Ceccaroni) and Germany (R. Von den Velden) reported the anti-diuretic effect of the substance extracted from the posterior lobe of the pituitary gland. The hormone responsible for this effect was later isolated and named vasopressin. Even while the pathophysiology of diabetes insipidus was being further clarified, these findings made possible a relatively simple and effective treatment such that physicians could begin to control the disease. Various preparations of the extract were produced and made commercially available by the pharmaceutical industry through the 20th century.

In 1928, Oliver Kamm and his colleagues posited two active principles in the pituitary extract: one with antidiuretic and pressor properties (vasopressin), and another with uterotonic properties (oxytocin). In a series of landmark achievements between 1947 and 1954 which culminated in a Nobel Prize in Chemistry (1955), Vincent du Vigneaud isolated, sequenced, and synthesized oxytocin and vasopressin. Today, synthesized and modified vasopressin is used to treat the condition.
