= Jeanette Crossley =

New Zealand biochemist (1949–2015)

Jeanette Crossley MNZM
- Born: 1949
- Died: 11 October 2015
- Known for: developing blood spot tests for cystic fibrosis, Addison's disease research
- Awards: Member of the New Zealand Order of Merit

Academic background
- Education: University of Auckland
- Thesis: The nature of urinary insulin in normal and diabetic subjects. (1973)

Jeanette Rosemary Crossley MNZM (née Niblett, 1949 – 11 October 2015) was a New Zealand biochemist, who pioneered the development of bloodspot tests for the diagnosis of cystic fibrosis. In 2009 Crossley was appointed a Member of the New Zealand Order of Merit for services to science, in particular Addison's disease.

== Academic career ==
Crossley completed a PhD titled The nature of urinary insulin in normal and diabetic subjects at the University of Auckland in 1973. Crossley worked for DSIR and then with Bob Elliott and P. A. Smith in the paediatrics department of the University of Auckland, where she developed a test for elevated trypsin levels in newborns using blood spots. This enabled nationwide screening of newborns and early diagnosis of cystic fibrosis, allowing earlier treatment and subsequent improvements in prognosis.

Crossley developed the New Zealand Addison's Network, a support network for New Zealanders with Addison's disease. She created a website and a newsletter issued three times a year, providing support for those with the disease. She also worked in paediatric diabetes research and was on the executive committee of the New Zealand Society for the Study of Diabetes.

In 1992 Crossley published a book about Matt Burke, a shepherd who worked on Ngamatea and Timahanga Stations.

== Honours and awards ==
In the 2009 New Year Honours Crossley was appointed a Member of the New Zealand Order of Merit for services to science, in particular Addison's disease.

== Personal life ==
Crossley was born in 1949, the only child of Eunice and Ernest Niblett. Crossley had Addison's disease and related autoimmune conditions, which restricted her life, and eventually led to her being bedridden. Crossley died in 2015 aged 66 years. She left a significant bequest to the University of Auckland, and funded research on loneliness in people with chronic and long-term illness.

== Selected works ==
- J. R. Crossley; R. B. Elliott; P. A. Smith (1979). "Dried-blood spot screening for cystic fibrosis in the newborn". The Lancet. 1 (8114): 472–474. doi:10.1016/s0140-6736(79)90825-0. PMID 85057. Wikidata Q39534705.
- Elliott, Robert Bartlett; J R Crossley; Berryman, Colleen; A G James (1981). "Partial preservation of pancreatic beta-cell function in children with diabetes". The Lancet. 2 (8236): 1–4. doi:10.1016/s0140-6736(81)90249-x. PMID 6113394. Wikidata Q72477079.
- S. J. Ashcroft; J. R. Crossley (1975). "The effects of glucose, N-acetylglucosamine, glyceraldehyde and other sugars on insulin release in vivo" (PDF). Diabetologia. 11 (4): 279–284. doi:10.1007/bf00422392. PMID 1205021. Wikidata Q67355004.
- J R Crossley; M Upsdell (1980). "The incidence of juvenile diabetes mellitus in New Zealand". Diabetologia. 18 (1): 29–34. doi:10.1007/bf01228298. PMID 7364162. Wikidata Q50592819.
- J R Crossley; P A Smith; B W Edgar; P D Gluckman; Elliott, Robert Bartlett (1981). "Neonatal screening for cystic fibrosis, using immunoreactive trypsin assay in dried blood spots". Clinica Chimica Acta. 113 (2): 111–121. doi:10.1016/0009-8981(81)90145-5. PMID 7249357. Wikidata Q70823208.
- S Serjeantson; J Theophilus; P Zimmet; J Court; J R Crossley; Elliott, Robert Bartlett (1981). "Lymphocytotoxic antibodies and histocompatibility antigens in juvenile-onset diabetes mellitus". Diabetes. 30 (1): 26–29. doi:10.2337/diab.30.1.26. PMID 7014302. Wikidata Q67301249.
- J. P. Palmer; M. K. Cooney; R. H. Ward; et al. (1982). "Reduced Coxsackie antibody titres in type 1 (insulin-dependent) diabetic patients presenting during an outbreak of Coxsackie B3 and B4 infection" (PDF). Diabetologia. 22 (6): 426–9. doi:10.1007/bf00282584. PMID 6286394. Wikidata Q57114796.
