= Andrew Cudworth =

English medical researcher (1939–82)

Major Andrew Gordon Cudworth MRCP
- Born: 16 March 1939; Liverpool, United Kingdom
- Died: 11 October 1982 (aged 43)
- Education: University of Liverpool
- Occupation: Medical Researcher
- Military career
- Allegiance: United Kingdom
- Branch: British Army
- Service years: 1963–1968
- Rank: Major

Andrew Gordon Cudworth MRCP (16 March 1939 – 11 October 1982) was an English medical researcher who specialised in immunology and diabetes. He discovered the genetic basis of childhood diabetes and popularised the classification of diabetes into type 1 and type 2.

== Biography ==
Andrew Cudworth was born in 1939 and graduated from the University of Liverpool School of Medicine in 1963. He joined the British Army as a medical officer after his graduation, serving for five years and earning the rank of major. He commenced physician training in Liverpool in 1971. He published his first paper, about immunology, in 1972; his second paper, published in 1972, was a case report on a patient with diabetes. His scientific interest in diabetes and immunology led him to discover soon afterwards that the more severe form of diabetes, which necessitated insulin and usually occurred in children, was linked to a specific genetic marker, and could be detected on a blood test.

Recognising the difference between juvenile-onset, insulin-dependent diabetes and mature-onset, non-insulin-dependent diabetes, Cudworth began using the terminology of type 1 and type 2 diabetes in 1976. The classification of diabetes into type 1 and type 2 was first used by Philip Hugh-Jones in a 1955 paper, but the terminology was revived and popularised by Cudworth. This remains the common terminology to differentiate the two forms of diabetes mellitus. Previously, the classification of diabetes was based on the age of onset – either juvenile or mature – whereas Cudworth's classification system was based on genetics.

In 1977, Cudworth was appointed a consultant physician at St Bartholomew's and Hackney Hospitals in London, where he also lectured at St Bartholomew's Hospital Medical College. He established the diabetic service at Hackney Hospital and collaborated with David J. Galton in the diabetic clinic at Barts. He became editor-in-chief of the international journal Diabetologia in 1980. He died in 1982 from a glioma.
