= Thomas Willis =

English doctor (1621–1675)

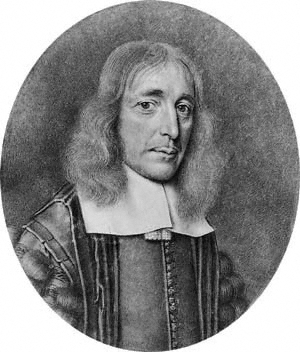
- Willis in 1667
- Born: 27 January 1621; Great Bedwyn, Wiltshire
- Died: 11 November 1675 (aged 54); London
- Education: Christ Church, Oxford
- Known for: Circle of Willis
- Spouse: Mary Fell
- Scientific career
- Fields: Anatomy; Neurology; Psychiatry

Thomas Willis FRS (27 January 1621 – 11 November 1675) was an English physician who played an important part in the history of anatomy, neurology, and psychiatry, and was a founding member of the Royal Society.

== Life ==
Willis was born on his parents' farm in Great Bedwyn, Wiltshire, where his father held the stewardship of the manor. He was a kinsman of the Willys baronets of Fen Ditton, Cambridgeshire. He graduated M.A. from Christ Church, Oxford in 1642. In the Civil War years he was a Royalist, dispossessed of the family farm at North Hinksey by Parliamentary forces. In the 1640s, Willis was one of the royal physicians to Charles I. Once qualified B. Med. in 1646, he began as an active physician by regularly attending the market at Abingdon, Oxfordshire.

He maintained an Anglican position; an Anglican congregation met at his lodgings in the 1650s, including John Fell, John Dolben, and Richard Allestree. Fell's father Samuel Fell had been expelled as Dean of Christ Church in 1647; Willis married Samuel Fell's daughter Mary, and his brother-in-law John Fell would later be his biographer. He employed Robert Hooke as an assistant, in the period 1656–8; this probably was another Fell family connection, since Samuel Fell knew Hooke's father in Freshwater, Isle of Wight.

One of several Oxford cliques of those interested in science grew up around Willis and Christ Church. Besides Hooke, others in the group were Nathaniel Hodges, John Locke, Richard Lower, Henry Stubbe and John Ward. (Locke went on to study with Thomas Sydenham, who would become Willis's leading rival, and who both politically and medically held some incompatible views). In the broader Oxford scene, he was a colleague in the "Oxford club" of experimentalists with Ralph Bathurst, Robert Boyle, William Petty, John Wilkins and Christopher Wren. Willis was on close terms with Wren's sister Susan Holder, skilled in the healing of wounds.

He and Petty were among the physicians involved in treating Anne Greene, a woman who survived her own hanging and was pardoned because her survival was widely held to be an act of divine intervention. The event was widely written about at the time, and helped to build Willis's career and reputation.

Willis lived on Merton Street, Oxford, from 1657 to 1667. In 1656 and 1659 he published two significant medical works, De Fermentatione and De Febribus. These were followed by the 1664 volume on the brain, which was a record of collaborative experimental work. From 1660 until his death, he was Sedleian Professor of Natural Philosophy at Oxford. At the time of the formation of the Royal Society of London, he was on the 1660 list of priority candidates, and became a Fellow in 1661. Henry Stubbe became a polemical opponent of the Society, and used his knowledge of Willis's earlier work before 1660 to belittle some of the claims made by its proponents.

Willis later worked as a physician in Westminster, London, this coming about after he treated Gilbert Sheldon in 1666. He had a successful medical practice, in which he applied both his understanding of anatomy and known remedies, attempting to integrate the two; he mixed both iatrochemical and mechanical views. According to Noga Arikha:

Willis combined the physician's expert anatomical sophistication with the fluent use of an interpretive apparatus that see-sawed between novelty and tradition, Galenism and Gassendist atomism, iatrochemistry and mechanism.

Among his patients was the philosopher Anne Conway, with whom he had intimate relations, but although he was consulted, Willis failed to relieve her headaches.

Willis is mentioned in John Aubrey's Brief Lives; their families became linked generations later through the marriage of Aubrey's distant cousin Sir John Aubrey, 6th Baronet of Llantrithyd to Martha Catherine Carter, the grand-niece of Sir William Willys, 6th Baronet of Fen Ditton.

== Research activity ==
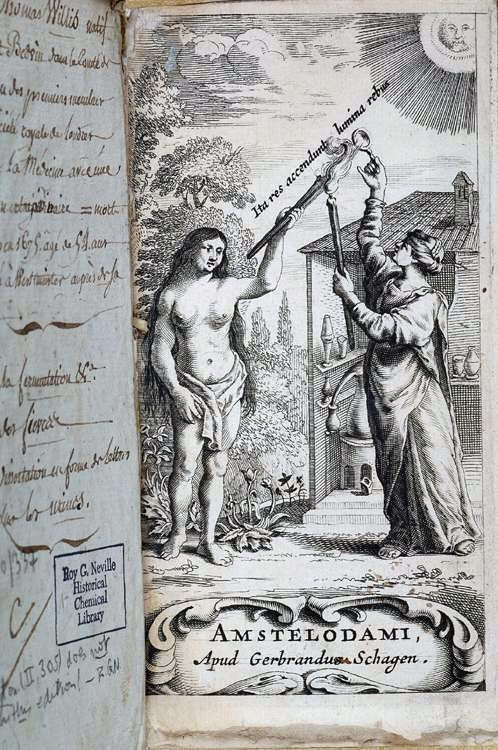
Frontispiece to Willis's 1663 Diatribae duae medico-philosophicae – quarum prior agit de fermentatione, engraved and published by Gerbrandus Schagen in Amsterdam

The Circle of Willis, a loop of arteries that supplies blood to the brain. As pictured in Cerebri anotome (1664).

Willis was a pioneer in research into the anatomy of the brain, nervous system and muscles. His most notable discovery was the "Circle of Willis", a circle of arteries on the base of the brain.

Willis's anatomy of the brain and nerves, as described in his Cerebri anatome of 1664, is minute and elaborate. This work coined the term neurology, and was not the result of his own personal and unaided exertions; he acknowledged his debt to Sir Christopher Wren, who provided drawings, Thomas Millington, and his fellow anatomist Richard Lower. It abounds in new information, and presents an enormous contrast with the vaguer efforts of his predecessors.

In 1667 Willis published Pathologicae cerebri, et nervosi generis specimen, an important work on the pathology and neurophysiology of the brain. In it he developed a new theory of the cause of epilepsy and other convulsive diseases, and contributed to the development of psychiatry. In 1672 he published the earliest English work on medical psychology, Two Discourses concerning the Soul of Brutes, which is that of the Vital and Sensitive of Man. Willis could be seen as an early pioneer of the mind-brain supervenience claim prominent in present-day neuropsychiatry and philosophy of mind. Unfortunately, his enlightenment did not improve his treatment of patients; in some cases, he advocated hitting the patient over the head with sticks.

Willis was the first to number the cranial nerves in the order in which they are now usually enumerated by anatomists. He noted the parallel lines of the mesolobe (corpus callosum), afterwards minutely described by Félix Vicq-d'Azyr. He seems to have recognised the communication of the convoluted surface of the brain and that between the lateral cavities beneath the fornix. He described the corpora striata and optic thalami; the four orbicular eminences, with the bridge, which he first named annular protuberance; and the white mammillary eminences, behind the infundibulum. In the cerebellum he remarks the arborescent arrangement of the white and grey matter and gives a good account of the internal carotids and the communications which they make with the branches of the basilar artery.

Willis replaced Nemesius's doctrine, which had identified the ventricles of the brain as the location of cognition. He deduced that the ventricles contained cerebrospinal fluid which collected waste products from effluents. Willis recognized the cortex as the substrate of cognition and claimed that the gyrencephalia was related to a progressive increase in the complexity of cognition. In his functional scheme, the origin of voluntary movements was placed at the cerebral cortex while involuntary movements came from the cerebellum.

He was one of the pioneers in diabetes research. An old name for the condition is "Willis's disease". He observed what had been known for many centuries in India, China and the Arab world, that the urine is sweet in patients (glycosuria), however he hadn't coined the term mellitus as it is commonly claimed. His observations on diabetes formed a chapter of Pharmaceutice rationalis (1674). Further research came from Johann Conrad Brunner, who had met Willis in London. Willis was the first to identify achalasia cardia in 1672.

== Influence ==
Willis's work gained currency in France through the writings of Daniel Duncan. The philosopher Richard Cumberland quickly applied the findings on brain anatomy to argue a case against Thomas Hobbes's view of the primacy of the passions. Willis's books, including Cerebri anatome and selected works in five volumes (1664) are listed as once in the library of Sir Thomas Browne. His son Edward Browne, who was President of the Royal College of Physicians from 1704 to 1707, also owned books by Willis.

== Family ==
By his wife, Mary Fell, Willis had five daughters and four sons, of whom four children survived early childhood. After Mary's death in 1670, he married the widow Elizabeth Calley, daughter of Matthew Nicholas in 1672; there were no children of this marriage.

=== Fenny Stratford church ===
Browne Willis, the antiquary, was son of Thomas Willis (1658–1699), the eldest son of Thomas and Mary. Between 1724 and 1730, Browne Willis rebuilt St. Martin's Church on the site of the old Chantry Chapel of St. Margaret and St. Catherine at Fenny Stratford. He erected the church as a memorial to his grandfather Willis who lived in St. Martin's Lane in the parish of St. Martin-in-the-Fields in London and who died on St. Martin's Day, 11 November 1675.

== Works ==
- 1663 Diatribae duae medico-philosophicae – quarum prior agit de fermentatione on Google Books
- 1664 Cerebri anatome: cui accessit nervorum descriptio et usus
- 1667 Pathologiae Cerebri et Nervosi Generis Specimen
- 1672 De Anima Brutorum
- 1675 Pharmaceutice rationalis. Sive Diatriba de medicamentorum operationibus in humano corpore on Google Books
- 1675 A plain and easie method for preserving (by God's blessing) those that are well from the infection of the plague, or any contagious distemper, in city, camp, fleet, &c., and for curing such as are infected with it
- 1677 Pharmaceutice rationalis sive diatriba de medicamentorum operationibus in humano corpore Digital version of Universitäts- und Landesbibliothek Düsseldorf
- 1681 Clarissimi Viri Thomae Willis, Medicinae Doctoris, Naturalis Philosophiae Professoris Oxoniensis ... Opera Omnia : Cum Elenchis Rerum Et Indicibus necessariis, ut & multis Figuris aeneis Digital version of Universitäts- und Landesbibliothek Düsseldorf
- 1683 Dissertation sur les urines tirée des ouvrages de Willis Digital version
