= Édouard Laguesse =

French pathologist and histologist

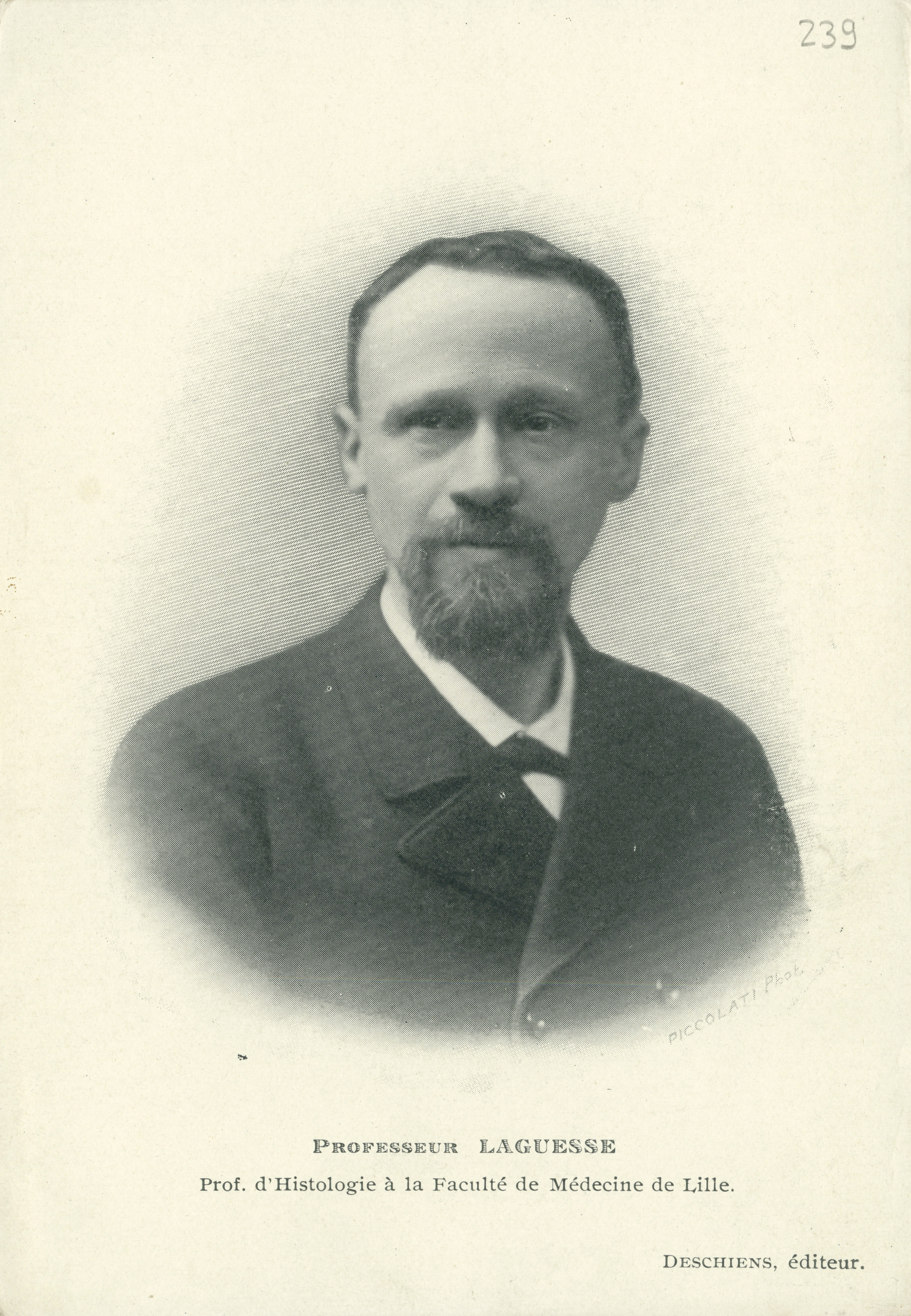
Édouard Laguesse

Gustave-Édouard Laguesse (23 April 1861 – 6 November 1927) was a French pathologist and histologist born in Dijon.

In 1885 he received his medical doctorate in Paris and from 1891 performed scientific research in Lille. In 1896 he became a professor of histology.

Laguesse is remembered for his histopathological work involving the pancreas. In 1893 he named the small cellular clusters of the pancreas the "Islets of Langerhans", in honor of their discoverer Paul Langerhans (1847-1888). At the time of its discovery, Langerhans provided an excellent description of the structures, but offered no further conclusions as to their function. Laguesse postulated that the Islets of Langerhans produced secretions that played a regulatory role in digestion. Laguesse's research was considered a major step on the path of discovery of a new hormone in the early days of endocrinology.

== Written works ==
- Le grain de sécrétion interne dans le pancréas (1899)
- Sur la variabilité du tissu endocrine dans la pancréas (1899)
- Substance amorphe et lamelles du tissu conjonctif lâche (1904)
