= Bob Elliott (medical researcher) =

New Zealand pediatrician (1934–2020)

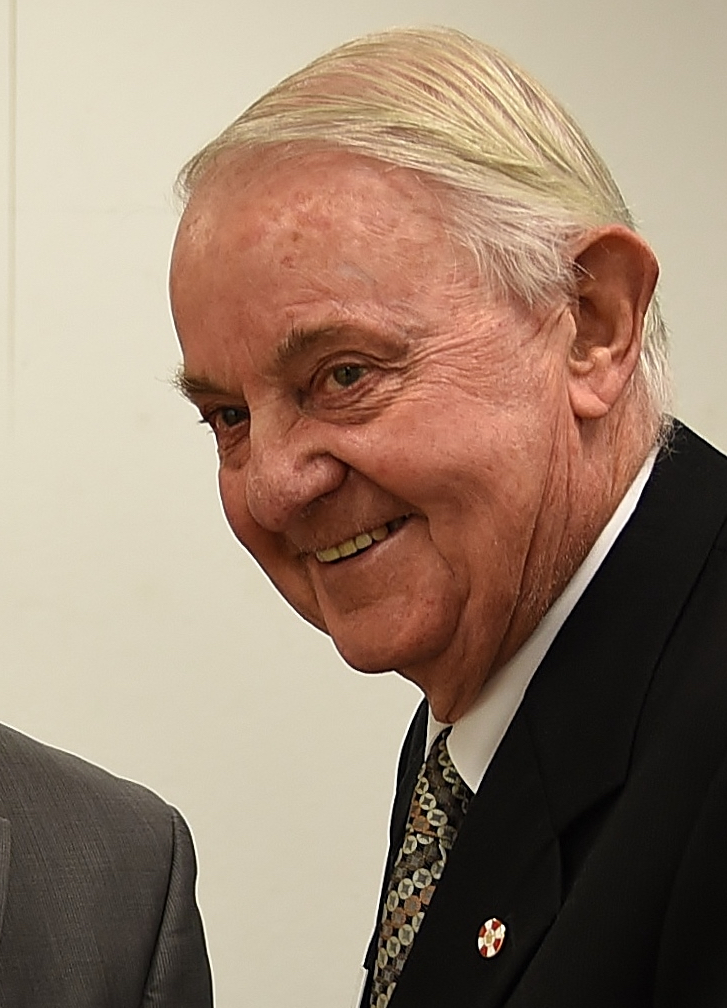
Elliott in 2016

Sir Robert Bartlett Elliott KNZM (3 January 1934 – 21 August 2020) was a New Zealand medical researcher.

Born in Adelaide, South Australia, on 3 January 1934, Elliott was educated at Adelaide High School, and studied medicine at the University of Adelaide from 1951 to 1956. After working as a house surgeon in Blenheim, New Zealand, he trained in paediatric medicine in Adelaide and Denver, Colorado. He was appointed as a senior lecturer at Adelaide in 1963, and in 1970 he moved to the University of Auckland School of Medicine as the foundation professor of paediatrics.

In the 1999 New Year Honours, Elliott was appointed a Companion of the New Zealand Order of Merit, for services to medical research. He was promoted to Knight Companion of the New Zealand Order of Merit, also for services to medical research, in the 2020 Queen's Birthday Honours.

Elliott died at his home in Auckland on 21 August 2020 at the age of 86.
