= Demetrius of Apamea =

Hellenistic physiologist

Demetrius of Apamea (fl. late-third to early-first century BC) was a Hellenistic physiologist of the Herophilean school.

He studied the sexual organs, focusing his attention on the treatment of ailments - instead of the reproductive physiology that was studied under Herophilos.
