= Philip Hugh-Jones =

British respiratory physician (1917–2010)

Philip Hugh-Jones FRCP
- Born: Philip Morrell Hugh-Jones; 22 August 1917; London
- Died: 1 June 2010 (aged 92)
- Education: King's College, Cambridge
- Known for: Coining type 1 and type 2 diabetes; Research in lung diseases
- Medical career
- Profession: Physician
- Institutions: King's College Hospital
- Sub-specialties: Lung disease and diabetes
- Research: Respiratory physiology
- Notable works: "The social consequences of pneumoconiosis among coalminers in South Wales", MRC (1951); diabetes in Jamaica (1955); "The Significance Of Lung Function Changes In Asbestosis" (1960)

Philip Hugh-Jones FRCP (22 August 1917 – 1 June 2010) was a British respiratory physician and Medical Research Council (MRC) researcher who during the Second World War investigated the effects of gun fumes on tank operators in Dorset and the effect of coal dust on Welsh coal miners with particular relevance to pneumoconiosis. This work led to future post-war pioneering research in lung physiology, the effect of asbestos on the lungs and lung diseases including emphysema.

Between 1952 and 1955, he took up a senior lecturer post at the then new University College of the West Indies and was the first to use the terminology of diabetes types 1, 2, and J in his 1955 paper for The Lancet titled "Diabetes in Jamaica".

Upon return to the UK, he became a consultant at the Hammersmith Hospital, London, where he continued MRC research on lung gas analysis using a newly modified mass spectrometer. Later, he would go on to King's College Hospital, where he continued research on lung diseases and set up a chest unit.

== Early life ==
Philip Morrell Hugh-Jones was born in London on 22 August 1917, the result of an affair between Philip Morrell, a Liberal Party politician who was married to Lady Ottoline Morrell, and Alice Louisa Jones who worked at The Nation. Both were associated with the Bloomsbury Group. He acquired the surname Hugh because Philip Morrell also had a legitimate son named Hugh.

He was educated at Highgate School, where he was head boy. Subsequently he gained admission to King's College, Cambridge, where he took the natural sciences tripos, passing with a first.

== Career ==
In 1942, Hugh-Jones gained his MB BChir and undertook his junior posts at Addenbrooke's Hospital in Cambridge. Later that year, while he was working on his MD, he was appointed to the staff of the Medical Research Council (MRC) and was posted to Dorset to investigate the effects of gun fumes on tank operators.

=== Pneumoconiosis Research Unit (PRU) ===
Before 1930, coal dust was not considered harmful. In 1936, the rise in the incidence of silicosis among coal miners resulted in a request from the Home Office to the MRC to "investigate the incidence and characteristics of disabling pulmonary diseases affecting workers in coal mines and the conditions which give rise to them". The conclusion of the investigation, which used extensive Xrays, was that there was another disease, "pneumoconiosis of coal miners".

After the Second World War, Hugh-Jones joined the newly set up Pneumoconiosis Research Unit (PRU) in Cardiff, South Wales. This unit first described two types of the lung disease pneumoconiosis (the two-disease hypothesis) in which the progress of the disease was halted in one group of patients (those with early disease) by removing them from the source of coal dust. Where the disease was progressive however, the lung damage would continue to develop however far they went from the source of the coal dust. The resulting increase in unemployment from taking men out of work due to early disease, led Hugh-Jones to publish "the social consequences of pneumoconiosis" in 1951. This work, co-authored with Charles M. Fletcher, reported that "at present some 5,000 men with pneumoconiosis, three-quarters of whom are probably capable of work under normal industrial conditions, are unemployed."

He later recounted a visit by Nobel laureate Edward Purcell. Both being interested in gas analysis, they proposed using a mass spectrometer to investigate lung gases. However, the equipment needed redesigning in order to function in people.

=== Diabetes in Jamaica ===
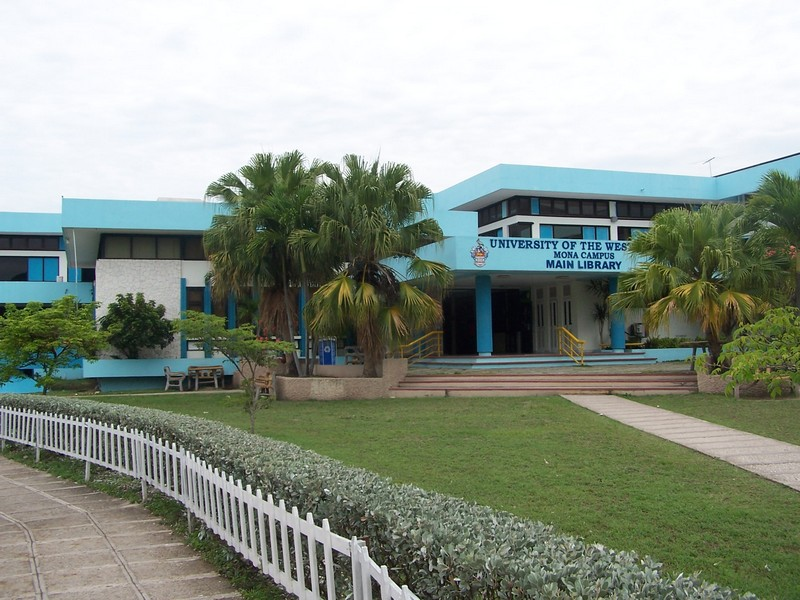
University of the West Indies Mona Campus, Jamaica

Following a successful application for a post as senior lecturer at the then new University College of the West Indies, advertised in the British Medical Journal in 1952, he moved with his family to Jamaica.

With respiratory disease of less interest in Jamaica, he focused his attention on diabetes, a disease traditionally thought of as one disease on a spectrum. However, a need for a classification had been noted by the French researchers Apollinaire Bouchardat and E. Lancereux between 1850 and 1875. They distinguished between those diabetics that were lean, had severe symptoms, a poor prognosis and pancreatic lesions at autopsy (diabetes maigre), and those that were overweight, presented later in life with a milder form of the disease and had a better prognosis if put on a low calorie diet (diabetes gras). Their theories were largely forgotten by the early twentieth century however, when diabetes was seen as a disease on a spectrum that was explained by reference to age of onset and severity. In 1950, R. D. Lawrence reported that diabetics were of two types, those who were not deficient in insulin and those who were. Subsequently, in 1955, Hugh-Jones published an article in The Lancet titled "Diabetes in Jamaica", in which he clarified Lawrence’s explanation of the two types of diabetes using the terminology of type 1 and type 2.

Hugh-Jones reported that 6% of the 215 diabetics attending the University College Hospital of the West Indies could not be classified as either type 1 or 2. They were young and underweight at the onset of their illness, but were resistant to insulin. If their diabetic control deteriorated, unlike in type 1 diabetes, the profound glycosuria was not accompanied with ketosis. He called this third type, type J, where J stood for Jamaica. Malnutrition was a key feature. It was later given various names including protein-deficient pancreatic diabetes, atypical diabetes and type 1B diabetes in the World Health Organization classification.

=== Hammersmith Hospital ===
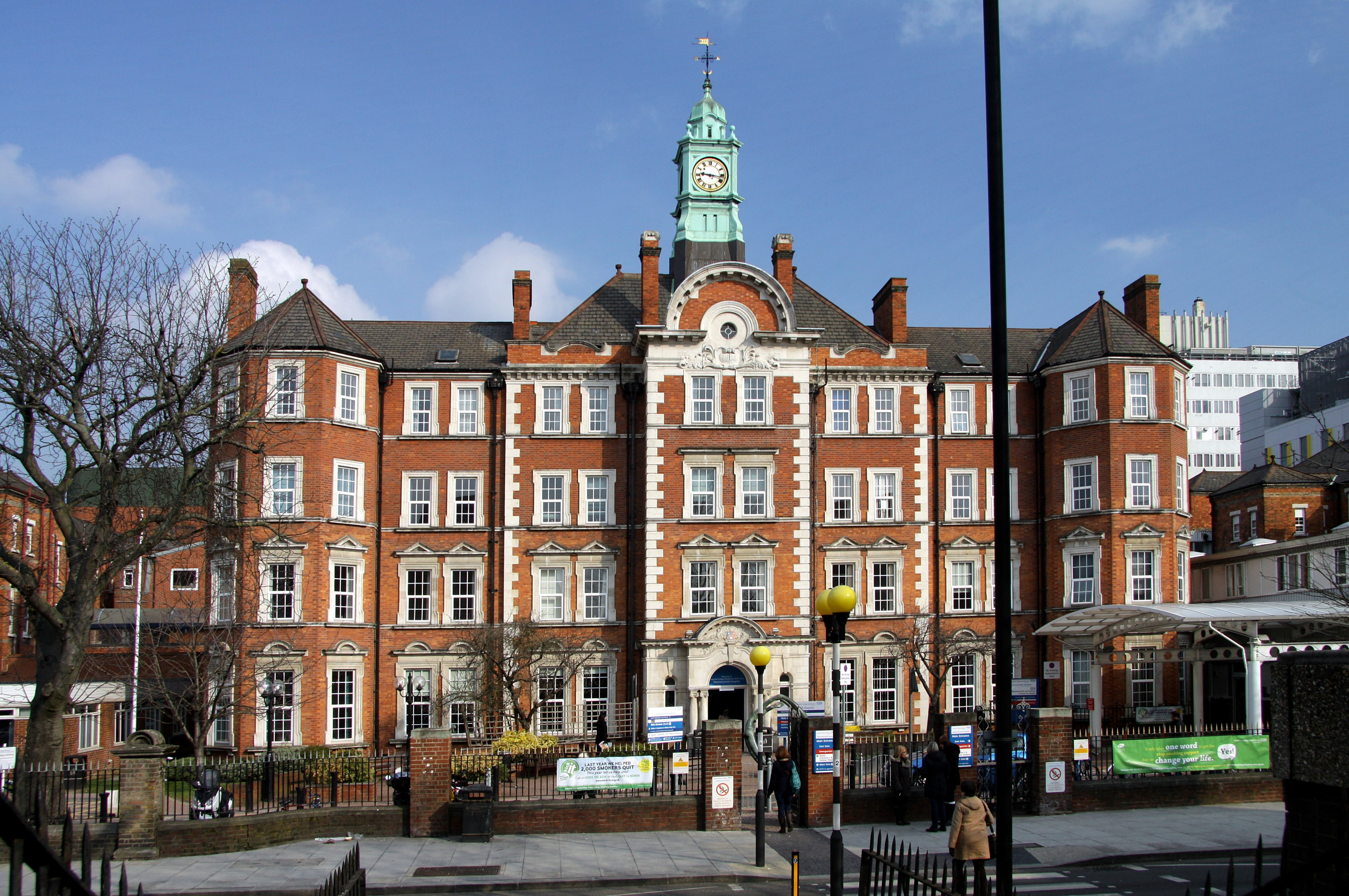
Hammersmith Hospital in 2013

Hugh-Jones retold in an interview that while he was in Jamaica, Australian designer Kemp Fowler had designed and produced a respiratory mass spectrometer that could be used in people. Previously its prototype was used by oil companies to detect different fractions of oil. Hammersmith Professor John McMichael subsequently persuaded Hugh-Jones to return to the UK and continue lung function research with the MRC at the Hammersmith Hospital.

In 1955, Hugh-Jones returned to the U.K. after three years in Jamaica, to lead an MRC group and become a consultant physician at the Hammersmith Hospital and a lecturer at the Royal Postgraduate Medical School. He witnessed the setting up of the UK's first mass spectrometer for research in lung function as part of the plan to develop an academic respiratory research group at the Hammersmith. He once accidentally recorded Prince Philip's lung function.

Around 1957, Hugh-Jones was interested in bronchoscopy and took gas samples from different areas of the lung, noting that particular patterns of alveolar gas concentrations were caused by airway or blood obstruction. He used radioactive oxygen-15. When a person took a breath of the radioactive gas, keeping hold of their breath, the radioactivity over parts of the chest correlated with ventilation over those parts of the lung. In addition, local blood flow correlated with the rate at which radioactivity was removed.

In addition, his work on the effects of asbestos on the lungs led him to frequently appear as an expert witness in asbestos trials.

=== Later career ===
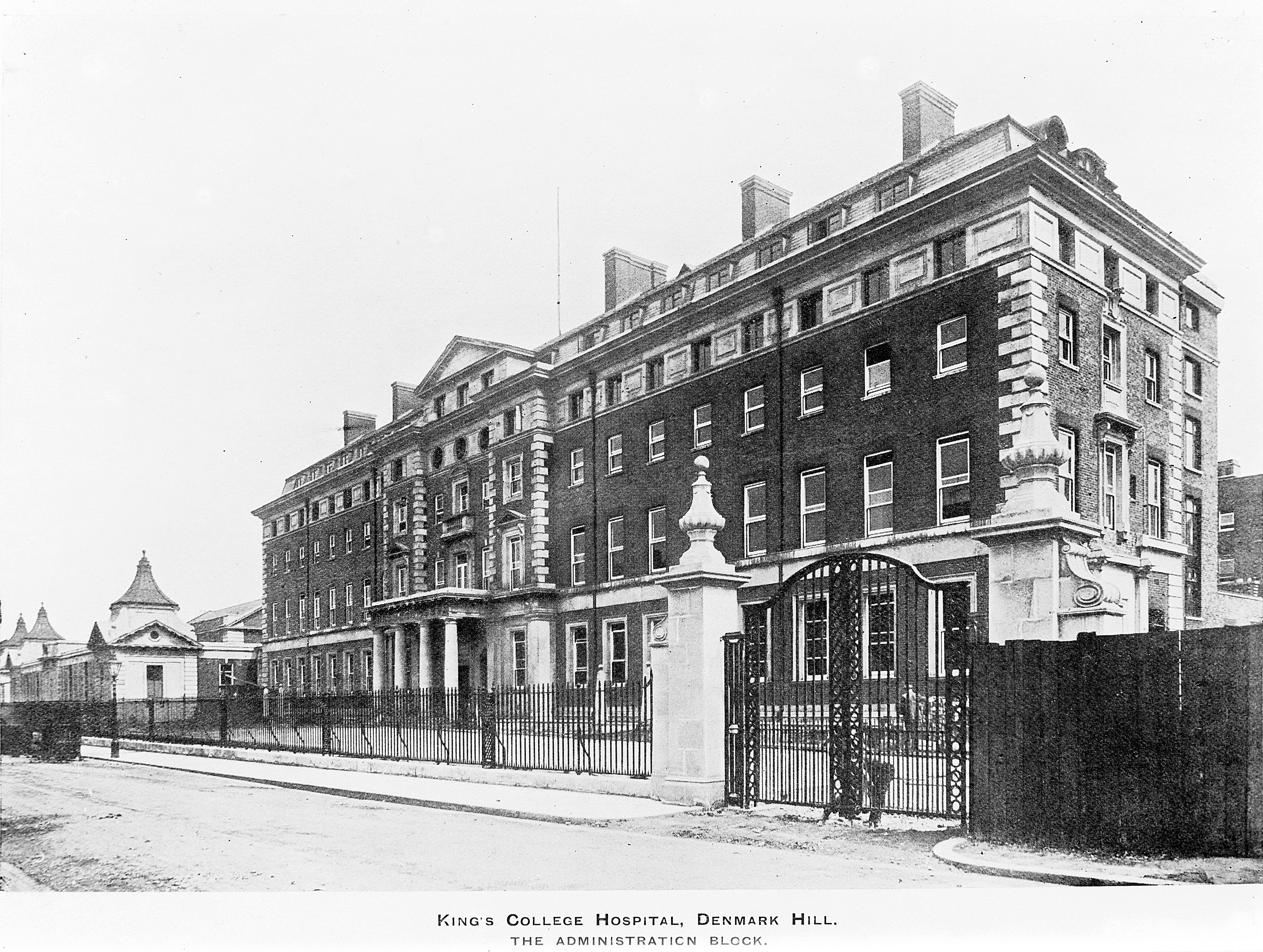
King's College Hospital

He joined King's College Hospital in 1964 where he continued his work in lung disease and set up their chest unit for the study and treatment of asthma, lung diseases, and sleep disorders. He was president of The Thoracic Society in 1979.

In 2000 he gave an oral history interview about his life to Queen Mary University of London.

== Personal life ==
Hugh-Jones first married Sheila Hails in 1940 with whom he had a son and a daughter. His second marriage was to Hilary which produced two sons.

He was a keen mountaineer and took friends, family, and colleagues on trips to the peaks of South America and Wales. He was an amateur painter. He suffered from bipolar disorder throughout his life.

== Death ==
Hugh-Jones died on 1 June 2010. His funeral was held at West Norwood Crematorium.

== Selected publications ==
- "The Social Consequences of Pneumoconiosis Among Coalminers in South Wales", co-authored with Charles M. Fletcher, Medical Research Council Memorandum (1951).
- "The Role of Periodic Examination in the Prevention of Coalworkers' Pneumoconiosis", co-authored with A.L. Cochrane, Charles Fletcher and J.C. Gilson, British Journal of Industrial Medicine, Vol. 8, No. 2 (Apr., 1951), pp. 53–61.
- "Diabetes in Jamaica", The Lancet, Vol. 266, No. 6896 (29 October 1955), pp. 891–897. doi:10.1016/S0140-6736(55)92530-7.
- "The preparation and use of oxygen-15 with particular reference to its value in the study of pulmonary malfunction", co-authored with N. A Dyson, G. R. Newbury, and J. B. West, Proceedings of the Second UN International Conference on Peaceful Uses of Atomic Energy, Isotopes in Medicine (1958) 26:103–115
- "The Significance Of Lung Function Changes In Asbestosis", co-authored with Roger William, Thorax (1960),15,109.
- "Anaesthesia for the Respiratory Cripple", Proceedings of the Royal Society of Medicine, Vol. 59, June 1966, pp. 519–522.
- "What's Wrong With the Funding of Cancer Research?", The British Medical Journal, Vol. 284, 1 May 1982, pp. 1325–1327.
- "A Rewarding Combination", Thorax. Vol. 47, No. 9 (Sept. 1992) p. 729.
