= David J. Galton =

British physician and researcher (1937–2024)

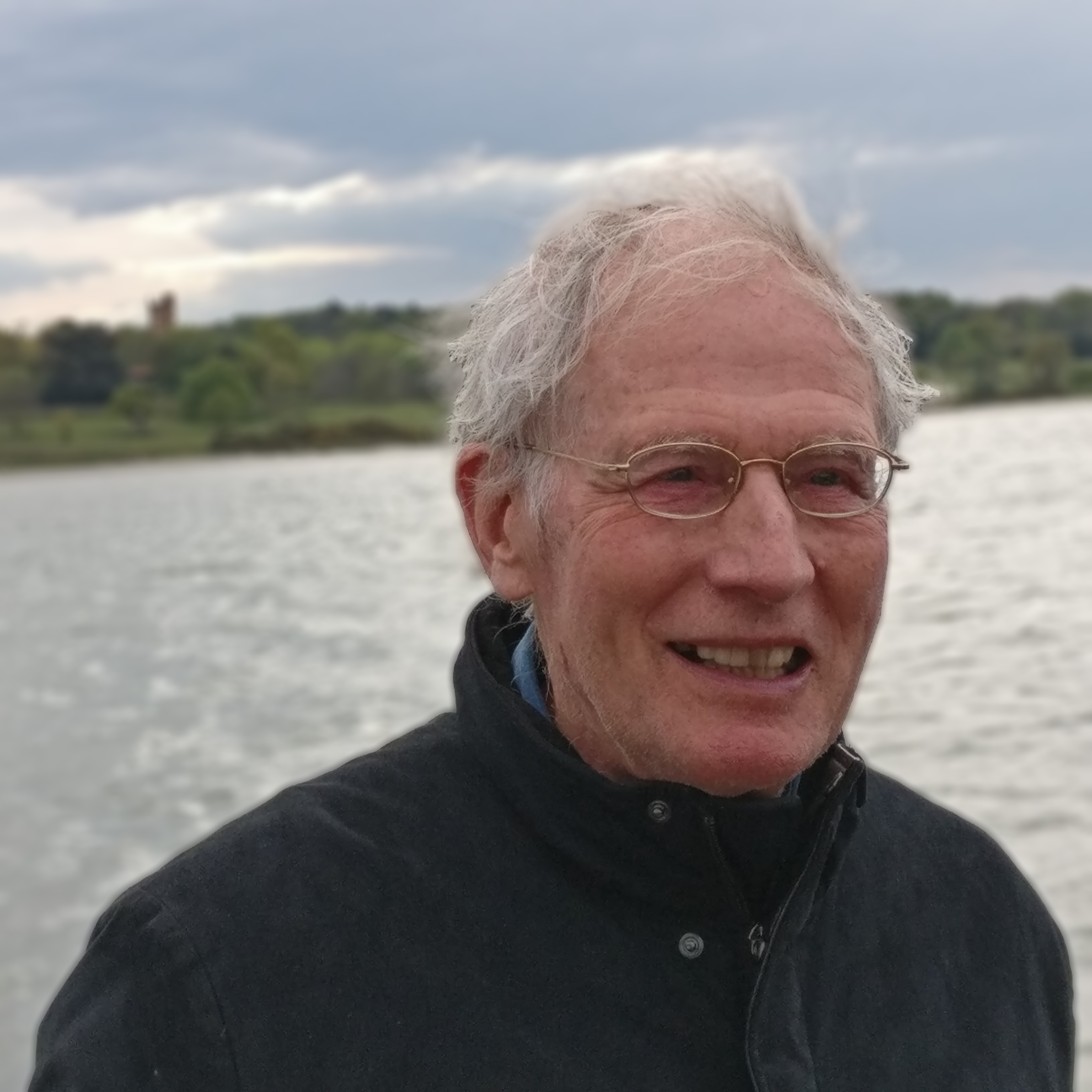
- Born: 2 May 1937
- Died: 30 January 2024 (aged 86)
- Education: University College London
- Scientific career
- Workplaces: University College London UK; National Institutes of Health, Bethesda USA; Tufts Medical Center, Boston USA; Hammersmith Hospital, London UK; St Bartholomew's Hospital Medical School, London UK

David Jeremy Galton (2 May 1937 – 30 January 2024) was a British physician and researcher in molecular genetics and metabolic disease, primarily the hyperlipidemias and diabetes mellitus.

He is not related to Francis Galton the Victorian-era polymath and eugenicist.

== Early life and education ==
David Galton was educated at Highgate School London and graduated from University College London in 1957 with a BSc (first class honours) and MB.BS (with honours in medicine) in 1960. After house-staff training he went to the National Institutes of Health, Bethesda Maryland, USA to study with Robert Scow and Martin Rodbell.

== Career ==
On returning to the UK he obtained a Fellowship at the Hammersmith Hospital to work with Russell Fraser and later elected to the consultant staff at St Bartholomew's Hospital London. He was then elected to a Professorship, Department of Medicine, London University and is now an Emeritus Professor at London University.

Galton was elected Chairman of Clinical Science from 1978 to 1980. He served on the scientific grants committee of Diabetes UK from 1984 to 1987 and again from 1989 to 1991. He was elected secretary of the European Atherosclerosis Society from 1988 to 1993 and Chairman of HEART UK from 1999 to 2001. He has been a Consultant Physician to St. Bartholomew's and Moorfield's Eye Hospitals.

He served as the librarian of the Galton Institute (formerly the British Eugenics Society) having previously served as vice-president.

== Research ==
His laboratory's main contributions have been to reveal defects of metabolic regulatory elements in common metabolic disease (mainly diabetes mellitus, the lipemias and atherosclerosis) at both phenotype and genotype levels:

His group identified the earliest loss of an allosteric regulation of a rate-determining enzyme, phosphofructokinase by citrate in minimal deviation tumours, lipomata. Many more such defects have subsequently come to light particularly to deregulate pathways in early neoplasia.

Abnormalities in the covalent modification of peptide regulators were found to have effects on enzyme activity. Thus one extra sialyl residue on apolipoprotein C3 impairs its action on lipoprotein lipase. This can affect expression of the resulting phenotype of hypertriglyceridemia.

His laboratory was one of the first to use single nucleotide polymorphisms (SNPs) to reveal susceptibility genes that predispose individuals to develop metabolic disorders, such as hypertriglyceridemia and atherosclerosis. This led eventually to the development of Genome Wide Association Studies (GWAS) where more than 1400 susceptibility loci have now been identified using SNPs and some have led to useful therapeutic agents such as volanesorsen

== Awards ==
- Travelling Research Fellowship from the Mental Health Research Fund 1960
- Doctor of Medicine London University 1967.
- Fellowship of the Royal College of Physicians, London 1975.
- Fellowship of the Royal College of Ophthalmology UK 1976.
- Erasmus European Professorship 1991.
- Doctor of Science London University 1992.
- Jephcott Fellowship of the Royal Society of Medicine London UK 1994.
- Tempus Professorship of the European Union 1996 and 1997.

== Bibliography ==
- Galton D J. The human adipose cell: a model for errors in metabolic regulation. Butterworths, London 1971. ISBN 0407557008
- Belfiore F, Galton DJ, Reaven GM (Eds). Diabetes Mellitus: Etiopathogenesis and Metabolic Aspects. Karger, Basel, New York 1984. ISBN 9783805537711
- Galton D J. Molecular Genetics of Common Metabolic Disease. Edward Arnold, London 1985.ISBN 0713144645
- Galton D J Genetica Molecular de las Enfermedades Metabolicas. Ediciones Doyma, Barcelona, Madrid 1985 ISBN 8475921914
- Galton D J, Assmann G (Eds). DNA polymorphisms as disease markers. Plenum Press, New York London 1990. ISBN 0306440393
- Galton DJ, Krone W. Hyperlipidaemia in Practice. Gower Medical Publishing. ISBN 0306440393
- Galton D J, Thompson G R (Eds). Lipids and Cardiovascular Disease. Churchill Livingstone International, London 1990. ISBN 0397447620
- Galton D J. In our own image: eugenics and the genetic modification of people. Little, Brown and Company. London 2001. ISBN 0316855928
- Galton D J. Eugenics: the future of life in the 21st. Century. Abacus 2001. ISBN 0349113777
- Galton D J. Standing on the shoulders of Darwin and Mendel: their views on heredity. CRC, Taylor& Francis 2018 ISBN 9781138062177
