= Diabetologia =

- Discipline: Diabetology
- Language: English
- Edited by: Hindrik Mulder

Publication details
- History: 1965-present
- Publisher: Springer Science+Business Media
- Frequency: Monthly
- Impact factor: 8.4 (2023)

Standard abbreviations
- ISO 4: Diabetologia

Indexing
- CODEN: DBTGAJ
- ISSN: 0012-186X
- LCCN: 65009991
- OCLC no.: 01566567

Links
- Journal homepage; Online access; journal page at publisher's website

Diabetologia is a monthly peer-reviewed medical journal covering diabetology and is the official journal of the European Association for the Study of Diabetes. It is published by Springer Nature and the editor-in-chief is Hindrik Mulder (Lund University). According to the Journal Citation Reports, the journal has a 2023 impact factor of 8.4, ranked 12/186 in Endocrinology and Metabolism. The 5-Year Impact Factor is 9.1.

== Previous editors ==
The following persons have been editors-in-chief of the journal:

- Sally Marshall 2016–2020
- Juleen Zierath 2010–2015
- Edwin Gale 2004–2010
- Werner Waldhäusl 1998–2003
- Ele Ferrannini 1993–1997
- C. Hellerström 1989–1992
- M. Berger 1983–1988
- A. G. Cudworth 1981–1982
- K. G. M. M. Alberti 1977–1980
- Werner Creutzfeldt 1973–1976
- K. Schöffling 1973–1976
- K. Oberdisse 1965–1972
