= Yu Yan (physician) =

Chinese physician and writer

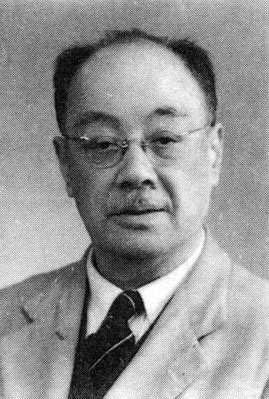
- Born: 14 September 1879; Zhenhai, Zhejiang
- Died: 3 January 1954 (aged 74)
- Education: Osaka Medical University (1908–1911, 1913–1916)

Yu Yan (Chinese: 余巖; pinyin: Yú Yán; 14 September 1879 – 3 January 1954), courtesy name Yu Yunxiu (Chinese: 余雲岫; pinyin: Yú Yúnxiù), was a Chinese physician and writer. A strident critic of traditional Chinese medicine, Yu first proposed abolishing its practice in 1929, although he maintained that Chinese drugs were effective and could be studied on their own, without invoking theories like yinyang or qi.

== Early life ==
Yu was born on 14 September 1879 in Zhenhai, Zhejiang. From 1908 to 1911 and 1913 to 1916, he studied Western medicine at the Osaka Medical University. During his time in Japan, Yu began to take a skeptical line with regards to traditional Chinese medicine. As early as 1914, he was already calling for the existing practice of Chinese medicine to be "completely obliterated". In a 1916 pamphlet, he opined that Chinese medical theories were "scientifically groundless".

== Career ==
As leader of the Shanghai chapter of the Pharmaceutical Association of China, Yu attended the inaugural National Public Health Conference in 1929, which was organised by the Nationalist government. At the conference, Yu forwarded a "Proposal to Abolish Old Medicine in order to Remove Obstacles to Medicine and Hygiene", (Note: In Chinese: Feizhi jiuyi yi saochu yishi weisheng zhi zhangaian (廢止舊醫以掃除醫事衛生之障礙案).) which would mandate practitioners of Chinese medicine to attend classes on Western medicine. Moreover, the proposal called for an outright ban on "schools of Chinese medicine, reports on Chinese medicine in medical journals, and all advertisements for Chinese medicine products or practitioners." The proposal was met with much backlash, although there were a handful of Chinese physicians who sympathised with Yu. In any case, it was passed on 25 February 1929. After a wave of demonstrations in support of Chinese medicine, the Guoyiguan (國醫館), or Institute of National Medicine (INM), which sought to promote and "scientise" Chinese medicine, was established in 1930.

Throughout his lifetime, Yu remained a vociferous critic of Chinese medicine. According to many of his peers, he came to represent "the oppressive force of Western medicine". Yu elaborates on his distrust of Chinese medicine in an essay: "We have to first recognize that those utterances about yinyang, the five phases, and the twelve jing-mai (circulation tracts) are simply all lies, absolutely not factual, and completely groundless... If anyone is half-hearted about abandoning those absurd ideas, I am not interested in talking with him."

At the same time, Yu recognised the efficacy of the drugs used in Chinese medicine. He stressed that he was in favour of "evidence-based formulas" and lamented that Chinese medicine had "regressed" since the Song dynasty. He cited the Shennong bencao—the earliest Chinese pharmacopoeia—as an example of knowledge based on "real phenomena" instead of qi or yin and yang. According to Sean Hsiang-lin Lei, Yu is "widely credited with creating and promoting the idea of a Chinese medical revolution". Yu's distinction between empirical, drug-based knowledge and Chinese medical theory prompted medical institutions across the country to prioritise the systemic and formulaic study of Chinese drugs.

In 1950, Yu attended the first National Health Conference in Beijing. He died of complications from diabetes and tuberculosis on 3 January 1954, at a hospital in Shanghai at the age of 74. His body was donated for medical research.
